

397001–397100 

|-bgcolor=#d6d6d6
| 397001 ||  || — || September 25, 2005 || Apache Point || A. C. Becker || EOS || align=right | 1.9 km || 
|-id=002 bgcolor=#d6d6d6
| 397002 ||  || — || September 27, 2005 || Apache Point || A. C. Becker || — || align=right | 2.5 km || 
|-id=003 bgcolor=#fefefe
| 397003 ||  || — || September 26, 2005 || Kitt Peak || Spacewatch || — || align=right data-sort-value="0.95" | 950 m || 
|-id=004 bgcolor=#d6d6d6
| 397004 ||  || — || September 27, 2005 || Kitt Peak || Spacewatch || — || align=right | 3.1 km || 
|-id=005 bgcolor=#d6d6d6
| 397005 ||  || — || October 1, 2005 || Catalina || CSS || — || align=right | 3.2 km || 
|-id=006 bgcolor=#d6d6d6
| 397006 ||  || — || October 1, 2005 || Catalina || CSS || EOS || align=right | 2.4 km || 
|-id=007 bgcolor=#E9E9E9
| 397007 ||  || — || September 11, 2005 || Anderson Mesa || LONEOS || — || align=right | 2.9 km || 
|-id=008 bgcolor=#fefefe
| 397008 ||  || — || October 1, 2005 || Kitt Peak || Spacewatch || — || align=right data-sort-value="0.69" | 690 m || 
|-id=009 bgcolor=#d6d6d6
| 397009 ||  || — || October 1, 2005 || Catalina || CSS || — || align=right | 4.0 km || 
|-id=010 bgcolor=#E9E9E9
| 397010 ||  || — || October 1, 2005 || Socorro || LINEAR || — || align=right | 2.6 km || 
|-id=011 bgcolor=#d6d6d6
| 397011 ||  || — || October 1, 2005 || Mount Lemmon || Mount Lemmon Survey || — || align=right | 2.6 km || 
|-id=012 bgcolor=#d6d6d6
| 397012 ||  || — || October 12, 2005 || Kitt Peak || Spacewatch || EUP || align=right | 4.7 km || 
|-id=013 bgcolor=#d6d6d6
| 397013 ||  || — || October 8, 2005 || Moletai || K. Černis, J. Zdanavičius || EOS || align=right | 1.8 km || 
|-id=014 bgcolor=#d6d6d6
| 397014 ||  || — || October 1, 2005 || Mount Lemmon || Mount Lemmon Survey || URS || align=right | 2.9 km || 
|-id=015 bgcolor=#d6d6d6
| 397015 ||  || — || October 5, 2005 || Catalina || CSS || — || align=right | 3.7 km || 
|-id=016 bgcolor=#d6d6d6
| 397016 ||  || — || October 5, 2005 || Catalina || CSS || — || align=right | 4.7 km || 
|-id=017 bgcolor=#d6d6d6
| 397017 ||  || — || September 24, 2005 || Kitt Peak || Spacewatch || EOS || align=right | 1.7 km || 
|-id=018 bgcolor=#d6d6d6
| 397018 ||  || — || October 7, 2005 || Kitt Peak || Spacewatch || — || align=right | 3.0 km || 
|-id=019 bgcolor=#d6d6d6
| 397019 ||  || — || October 7, 2005 || Kitt Peak || Spacewatch || — || align=right | 3.6 km || 
|-id=020 bgcolor=#d6d6d6
| 397020 ||  || — || September 30, 2005 || Kitt Peak || Spacewatch || — || align=right | 3.2 km || 
|-id=021 bgcolor=#d6d6d6
| 397021 ||  || — || October 6, 2005 || Kitt Peak || Spacewatch || — || align=right | 2.8 km || 
|-id=022 bgcolor=#d6d6d6
| 397022 ||  || — || October 8, 2005 || Kitt Peak || Spacewatch || — || align=right | 2.3 km || 
|-id=023 bgcolor=#d6d6d6
| 397023 ||  || — || October 9, 2005 || Kitt Peak || Spacewatch || — || align=right | 3.4 km || 
|-id=024 bgcolor=#fefefe
| 397024 ||  || — || October 1, 2005 || Catalina || CSS || — || align=right data-sort-value="0.81" | 810 m || 
|-id=025 bgcolor=#d6d6d6
| 397025 ||  || — || October 1, 2005 || Mount Lemmon || Mount Lemmon Survey || — || align=right | 3.1 km || 
|-id=026 bgcolor=#d6d6d6
| 397026 ||  || — || October 26, 2005 || Mount Graham || W. H. Ryan || — || align=right | 2.3 km || 
|-id=027 bgcolor=#d6d6d6
| 397027 ||  || — || October 27, 2005 || Ottmarsheim || C. Rinner || — || align=right | 2.0 km || 
|-id=028 bgcolor=#fefefe
| 397028 ||  || — || October 7, 2005 || Catalina || CSS || — || align=right data-sort-value="0.81" | 810 m || 
|-id=029 bgcolor=#d6d6d6
| 397029 ||  || — || October 30, 2005 || Mayhill || E. Guido || — || align=right | 3.4 km || 
|-id=030 bgcolor=#fefefe
| 397030 ||  || — || October 22, 2005 || Kitt Peak || Spacewatch || — || align=right data-sort-value="0.85" | 850 m || 
|-id=031 bgcolor=#fefefe
| 397031 ||  || — || October 22, 2005 || Kitt Peak || Spacewatch || — || align=right data-sort-value="0.87" | 870 m || 
|-id=032 bgcolor=#fefefe
| 397032 ||  || — || September 30, 2005 || Catalina || CSS || — || align=right | 1.1 km || 
|-id=033 bgcolor=#fefefe
| 397033 ||  || — || October 22, 2005 || Kitt Peak || Spacewatch || — || align=right data-sort-value="0.81" | 810 m || 
|-id=034 bgcolor=#d6d6d6
| 397034 ||  || — || October 23, 2005 || Palomar || NEAT || — || align=right | 4.5 km || 
|-id=035 bgcolor=#fefefe
| 397035 ||  || — || October 23, 2005 || Catalina || CSS || — || align=right | 1.0 km || 
|-id=036 bgcolor=#d6d6d6
| 397036 ||  || — || October 23, 2005 || Catalina || CSS || — || align=right | 5.1 km || 
|-id=037 bgcolor=#fefefe
| 397037 ||  || — || October 23, 2005 || Catalina || CSS || — || align=right data-sort-value="0.67" | 670 m || 
|-id=038 bgcolor=#fefefe
| 397038 ||  || — || September 25, 2005 || Kitt Peak || Spacewatch || — || align=right data-sort-value="0.80" | 800 m || 
|-id=039 bgcolor=#fefefe
| 397039 ||  || — || October 23, 2005 || Catalina || CSS || — || align=right data-sort-value="0.86" | 860 m || 
|-id=040 bgcolor=#d6d6d6
| 397040 ||  || — || October 25, 2005 || Mount Lemmon || Mount Lemmon Survey || EOS || align=right | 2.0 km || 
|-id=041 bgcolor=#d6d6d6
| 397041 ||  || — || October 22, 2005 || Palomar || NEAT || — || align=right | 3.0 km || 
|-id=042 bgcolor=#d6d6d6
| 397042 ||  || — || October 23, 2005 || Palomar || NEAT || EOS || align=right | 2.5 km || 
|-id=043 bgcolor=#fefefe
| 397043 ||  || — || October 23, 2005 || Catalina || CSS || V || align=right data-sort-value="0.76" | 760 m || 
|-id=044 bgcolor=#fefefe
| 397044 ||  || — || October 25, 2005 || Kitt Peak || Spacewatch || — || align=right data-sort-value="0.80" | 800 m || 
|-id=045 bgcolor=#d6d6d6
| 397045 ||  || — || October 1, 2005 || Mount Lemmon || Mount Lemmon Survey || — || align=right | 2.6 km || 
|-id=046 bgcolor=#d6d6d6
| 397046 ||  || — || October 22, 2005 || Kitt Peak || Spacewatch || — || align=right | 3.6 km || 
|-id=047 bgcolor=#d6d6d6
| 397047 ||  || — || October 22, 2005 || Kitt Peak || Spacewatch || — || align=right | 3.4 km || 
|-id=048 bgcolor=#d6d6d6
| 397048 ||  || — || October 22, 2005 || Kitt Peak || Spacewatch || — || align=right | 2.6 km || 
|-id=049 bgcolor=#d6d6d6
| 397049 ||  || — || October 22, 2005 || Kitt Peak || Spacewatch || TIR || align=right | 3.2 km || 
|-id=050 bgcolor=#d6d6d6
| 397050 ||  || — || October 22, 2005 || Kitt Peak || Spacewatch || — || align=right | 3.3 km || 
|-id=051 bgcolor=#fefefe
| 397051 ||  || — || October 22, 2005 || Kitt Peak || Spacewatch || — || align=right data-sort-value="0.92" | 920 m || 
|-id=052 bgcolor=#d6d6d6
| 397052 ||  || — || October 22, 2005 || Kitt Peak || Spacewatch || — || align=right | 2.9 km || 
|-id=053 bgcolor=#d6d6d6
| 397053 ||  || — || October 22, 2005 || Kitt Peak || Spacewatch || THM || align=right | 2.0 km || 
|-id=054 bgcolor=#d6d6d6
| 397054 ||  || — || October 22, 2005 || Kitt Peak || Spacewatch || — || align=right | 3.3 km || 
|-id=055 bgcolor=#fefefe
| 397055 ||  || — || October 22, 2005 || Palomar || NEAT || — || align=right data-sort-value="0.79" | 790 m || 
|-id=056 bgcolor=#d6d6d6
| 397056 ||  || — || October 22, 2005 || Kitt Peak || Spacewatch || — || align=right | 3.3 km || 
|-id=057 bgcolor=#d6d6d6
| 397057 ||  || — || October 24, 2005 || Kitt Peak || Spacewatch || — || align=right | 3.3 km || 
|-id=058 bgcolor=#d6d6d6
| 397058 ||  || — || October 24, 2005 || Kitt Peak || Spacewatch || — || align=right | 4.6 km || 
|-id=059 bgcolor=#fefefe
| 397059 ||  || — || October 24, 2005 || Kitt Peak || Spacewatch || — || align=right data-sort-value="0.75" | 750 m || 
|-id=060 bgcolor=#d6d6d6
| 397060 ||  || — || October 25, 2005 || Anderson Mesa || LONEOS || — || align=right | 5.0 km || 
|-id=061 bgcolor=#fefefe
| 397061 ||  || — || October 26, 2005 || Kitt Peak || Spacewatch || — || align=right data-sort-value="0.89" | 890 m || 
|-id=062 bgcolor=#d6d6d6
| 397062 ||  || — || October 26, 2005 || Kitt Peak || Spacewatch || — || align=right | 3.3 km || 
|-id=063 bgcolor=#d6d6d6
| 397063 ||  || — || October 26, 2005 || Kitt Peak || Spacewatch || — || align=right | 4.3 km || 
|-id=064 bgcolor=#d6d6d6
| 397064 ||  || — || October 26, 2005 || Kitt Peak || Spacewatch || — || align=right | 3.2 km || 
|-id=065 bgcolor=#d6d6d6
| 397065 ||  || — || October 25, 2005 || Kitt Peak || Spacewatch || — || align=right | 3.0 km || 
|-id=066 bgcolor=#d6d6d6
| 397066 ||  || — || October 25, 2005 || Kitt Peak || Spacewatch || — || align=right | 3.2 km || 
|-id=067 bgcolor=#fefefe
| 397067 ||  || — || October 5, 2005 || Catalina || CSS || — || align=right data-sort-value="0.87" | 870 m || 
|-id=068 bgcolor=#fefefe
| 397068 ||  || — || October 25, 2005 || Kitt Peak || Spacewatch || — || align=right data-sort-value="0.94" | 940 m || 
|-id=069 bgcolor=#fefefe
| 397069 ||  || — || October 23, 2005 || Kitt Peak || Spacewatch || — || align=right data-sort-value="0.72" | 720 m || 
|-id=070 bgcolor=#fefefe
| 397070 ||  || — || October 5, 2005 || Kitt Peak || Spacewatch || — || align=right data-sort-value="0.78" | 780 m || 
|-id=071 bgcolor=#fefefe
| 397071 ||  || — || October 24, 2005 || Kitt Peak || Spacewatch || — || align=right data-sort-value="0.65" | 650 m || 
|-id=072 bgcolor=#d6d6d6
| 397072 ||  || — || October 24, 2005 || Kitt Peak || Spacewatch || — || align=right | 4.4 km || 
|-id=073 bgcolor=#d6d6d6
| 397073 ||  || — || October 24, 2005 || Kitt Peak || Spacewatch || — || align=right | 3.1 km || 
|-id=074 bgcolor=#d6d6d6
| 397074 ||  || — || October 25, 2005 || Kitt Peak || Spacewatch || EOS || align=right | 1.8 km || 
|-id=075 bgcolor=#fefefe
| 397075 ||  || — || October 25, 2005 || Mount Lemmon || Mount Lemmon Survey || — || align=right data-sort-value="0.64" | 640 m || 
|-id=076 bgcolor=#d6d6d6
| 397076 ||  || — || October 25, 2005 || Mount Lemmon || Mount Lemmon Survey || — || align=right | 2.8 km || 
|-id=077 bgcolor=#fefefe
| 397077 ||  || — || October 25, 2005 || Kitt Peak || Spacewatch || — || align=right data-sort-value="0.89" | 890 m || 
|-id=078 bgcolor=#d6d6d6
| 397078 ||  || — || October 28, 2005 || Mount Lemmon || Mount Lemmon Survey || — || align=right | 2.3 km || 
|-id=079 bgcolor=#d6d6d6
| 397079 ||  || — || October 22, 2005 || Kitt Peak || Spacewatch || — || align=right | 2.8 km || 
|-id=080 bgcolor=#d6d6d6
| 397080 ||  || — || October 26, 2005 || Anderson Mesa || LONEOS || — || align=right | 3.2 km || 
|-id=081 bgcolor=#d6d6d6
| 397081 ||  || — || October 25, 2005 || Kitt Peak || Spacewatch || EOS || align=right | 2.1 km || 
|-id=082 bgcolor=#d6d6d6
| 397082 ||  || — || October 29, 2005 || Catalina || CSS || — || align=right | 5.1 km || 
|-id=083 bgcolor=#d6d6d6
| 397083 ||  || — || October 26, 2005 || Kitt Peak || Spacewatch || — || align=right | 2.9 km || 
|-id=084 bgcolor=#d6d6d6
| 397084 ||  || — || October 26, 2005 || Kitt Peak || Spacewatch || EOS || align=right | 1.4 km || 
|-id=085 bgcolor=#d6d6d6
| 397085 ||  || — || October 26, 2005 || Kitt Peak || Spacewatch || VER || align=right | 2.8 km || 
|-id=086 bgcolor=#d6d6d6
| 397086 ||  || — || October 26, 2005 || Kitt Peak || Spacewatch || — || align=right | 3.4 km || 
|-id=087 bgcolor=#d6d6d6
| 397087 ||  || — || October 27, 2005 || Mount Lemmon || Mount Lemmon Survey || — || align=right | 2.9 km || 
|-id=088 bgcolor=#d6d6d6
| 397088 ||  || — || October 27, 2005 || Catalina || CSS || — || align=right | 3.2 km || 
|-id=089 bgcolor=#d6d6d6
| 397089 ||  || — || October 22, 2005 || Kitt Peak || Spacewatch || — || align=right | 2.7 km || 
|-id=090 bgcolor=#d6d6d6
| 397090 ||  || — || October 27, 2005 || Palomar || NEAT || — || align=right | 2.9 km || 
|-id=091 bgcolor=#fefefe
| 397091 ||  || — || October 27, 2005 || Palomar || NEAT || — || align=right | 1.0 km || 
|-id=092 bgcolor=#d6d6d6
| 397092 ||  || — || October 31, 2005 || Mount Lemmon || Mount Lemmon Survey || EOS || align=right | 2.4 km || 
|-id=093 bgcolor=#d6d6d6
| 397093 ||  || — || October 27, 2005 || Kitt Peak || Spacewatch || — || align=right | 2.9 km || 
|-id=094 bgcolor=#d6d6d6
| 397094 ||  || — || October 30, 2005 || Mount Lemmon || Mount Lemmon Survey || — || align=right | 2.5 km || 
|-id=095 bgcolor=#d6d6d6
| 397095 ||  || — || October 31, 2005 || Kitt Peak || Spacewatch || — || align=right | 2.3 km || 
|-id=096 bgcolor=#d6d6d6
| 397096 ||  || — || October 29, 2005 || Kitt Peak || Spacewatch || — || align=right | 4.0 km || 
|-id=097 bgcolor=#d6d6d6
| 397097 ||  || — || October 31, 2005 || Kitt Peak || Spacewatch || — || align=right | 2.6 km || 
|-id=098 bgcolor=#fefefe
| 397098 ||  || — || October 27, 2005 || Mount Lemmon || Mount Lemmon Survey || — || align=right data-sort-value="0.66" | 660 m || 
|-id=099 bgcolor=#fefefe
| 397099 ||  || — || October 30, 2005 || Kitt Peak || Spacewatch || — || align=right data-sort-value="0.65" | 650 m || 
|-id=100 bgcolor=#d6d6d6
| 397100 ||  || — || October 30, 2005 || Kitt Peak || Spacewatch || ELF || align=right | 3.4 km || 
|}

397101–397200 

|-bgcolor=#d6d6d6
| 397101 ||  || — || October 25, 2005 || Socorro || LINEAR || — || align=right | 3.1 km || 
|-id=102 bgcolor=#d6d6d6
| 397102 ||  || — || October 28, 2005 || Kitt Peak || Spacewatch || — || align=right | 3.1 km || 
|-id=103 bgcolor=#d6d6d6
| 397103 ||  || — || October 22, 2005 || Apache Point || A. C. Becker || — || align=right | 3.2 km || 
|-id=104 bgcolor=#d6d6d6
| 397104 ||  || — || October 22, 2005 || Apache Point || A. C. Becker || — || align=right | 2.8 km || 
|-id=105 bgcolor=#d6d6d6
| 397105 ||  || — || October 25, 2005 || Apache Point || A. C. Becker || — || align=right | 2.7 km || 
|-id=106 bgcolor=#d6d6d6
| 397106 ||  || — || October 26, 2005 || Apache Point || A. C. Becker || — || align=right | 2.3 km || 
|-id=107 bgcolor=#d6d6d6
| 397107 ||  || — || October 26, 2005 || Apache Point || A. C. Becker || — || align=right | 3.5 km || 
|-id=108 bgcolor=#fefefe
| 397108 ||  || — || October 27, 2005 || Apache Point || A. C. Becker || — || align=right data-sort-value="0.55" | 550 m || 
|-id=109 bgcolor=#d6d6d6
| 397109 ||  || — || November 1, 2005 || Kitt Peak || Spacewatch || — || align=right | 3.9 km || 
|-id=110 bgcolor=#d6d6d6
| 397110 ||  || — || November 4, 2005 || Kitt Peak || Spacewatch || — || align=right | 2.2 km || 
|-id=111 bgcolor=#d6d6d6
| 397111 ||  || — || November 3, 2005 || Mount Lemmon || Mount Lemmon Survey || — || align=right | 2.6 km || 
|-id=112 bgcolor=#d6d6d6
| 397112 ||  || — || May 22, 2003 || Kitt Peak || Spacewatch || — || align=right | 4.1 km || 
|-id=113 bgcolor=#d6d6d6
| 397113 ||  || — || November 4, 2005 || Kitt Peak || Spacewatch || — || align=right | 2.8 km || 
|-id=114 bgcolor=#fefefe
| 397114 ||  || — || November 6, 2005 || Kitt Peak || Spacewatch || — || align=right data-sort-value="0.77" | 770 m || 
|-id=115 bgcolor=#fefefe
| 397115 ||  || — || November 6, 2005 || Socorro || LINEAR || — || align=right data-sort-value="0.76" | 760 m || 
|-id=116 bgcolor=#d6d6d6
| 397116 ||  || — || October 28, 2005 || Mount Lemmon || Mount Lemmon Survey || — || align=right | 2.9 km || 
|-id=117 bgcolor=#fefefe
| 397117 ||  || — || November 1, 2005 || Anderson Mesa || LONEOS || — || align=right | 1.1 km || 
|-id=118 bgcolor=#d6d6d6
| 397118 ||  || — || October 26, 2005 || Kitt Peak || Spacewatch || — || align=right | 2.3 km || 
|-id=119 bgcolor=#fefefe
| 397119 ||  || — || November 6, 2005 || Mount Lemmon || Mount Lemmon Survey || — || align=right data-sort-value="0.91" | 910 m || 
|-id=120 bgcolor=#fefefe
| 397120 ||  || — || November 6, 2005 || Kitt Peak || Spacewatch || — || align=right data-sort-value="0.82" | 820 m || 
|-id=121 bgcolor=#d6d6d6
| 397121 ||  || — || November 1, 2005 || Apache Point || A. C. Becker || EOS || align=right | 1.8 km || 
|-id=122 bgcolor=#d6d6d6
| 397122 ||  || — || November 21, 2005 || Kitt Peak || Spacewatch || 7:4 || align=right | 4.3 km || 
|-id=123 bgcolor=#d6d6d6
| 397123 ||  || — || November 22, 2005 || Kitt Peak || Spacewatch || — || align=right | 3.1 km || 
|-id=124 bgcolor=#fefefe
| 397124 ||  || — || November 21, 2005 || Kitt Peak || Spacewatch || — || align=right data-sort-value="0.73" | 730 m || 
|-id=125 bgcolor=#d6d6d6
| 397125 ||  || — || November 21, 2005 || Kitt Peak || Spacewatch || — || align=right | 4.3 km || 
|-id=126 bgcolor=#fefefe
| 397126 ||  || — || November 21, 2005 || Kitt Peak || Spacewatch || — || align=right data-sort-value="0.77" | 770 m || 
|-id=127 bgcolor=#d6d6d6
| 397127 ||  || — || November 22, 2005 || Kitt Peak || Spacewatch || — || align=right | 3.2 km || 
|-id=128 bgcolor=#E9E9E9
| 397128 ||  || — || October 24, 2005 || Kitt Peak || Spacewatch || — || align=right | 2.6 km || 
|-id=129 bgcolor=#fefefe
| 397129 ||  || — || November 21, 2005 || Kitt Peak || Spacewatch || — || align=right | 1.0 km || 
|-id=130 bgcolor=#fefefe
| 397130 ||  || — || November 24, 2005 || Palomar || NEAT || — || align=right | 1.3 km || 
|-id=131 bgcolor=#FA8072
| 397131 ||  || — || November 29, 2005 || Socorro || LINEAR || — || align=right | 1.2 km || 
|-id=132 bgcolor=#d6d6d6
| 397132 ||  || — || November 25, 2005 || Kitt Peak || Spacewatch || — || align=right | 4.0 km || 
|-id=133 bgcolor=#fefefe
| 397133 ||  || — || November 28, 2005 || Mount Lemmon || Mount Lemmon Survey || — || align=right data-sort-value="0.99" | 990 m || 
|-id=134 bgcolor=#fefefe
| 397134 ||  || — || November 25, 2005 || Mount Lemmon || Mount Lemmon Survey || — || align=right data-sort-value="0.62" | 620 m || 
|-id=135 bgcolor=#fefefe
| 397135 ||  || — || November 10, 2005 || Catalina || CSS || — || align=right data-sort-value="0.86" | 860 m || 
|-id=136 bgcolor=#fefefe
| 397136 ||  || — || October 29, 2005 || Mount Lemmon || Mount Lemmon Survey || — || align=right data-sort-value="0.94" | 940 m || 
|-id=137 bgcolor=#fefefe
| 397137 ||  || — || November 25, 2005 || Mount Lemmon || Mount Lemmon Survey || V || align=right data-sort-value="0.71" | 710 m || 
|-id=138 bgcolor=#d6d6d6
| 397138 ||  || — || November 30, 2005 || Mount Lemmon || Mount Lemmon Survey || TIR || align=right | 3.7 km || 
|-id=139 bgcolor=#fefefe
| 397139 ||  || — || November 28, 2005 || Catalina || CSS || — || align=right data-sort-value="0.98" | 980 m || 
|-id=140 bgcolor=#fefefe
| 397140 ||  || — || November 25, 2005 || Mount Lemmon || Mount Lemmon Survey || — || align=right data-sort-value="0.75" | 750 m || 
|-id=141 bgcolor=#d6d6d6
| 397141 ||  || — || November 25, 2005 || Mount Lemmon || Mount Lemmon Survey || EMA || align=right | 4.4 km || 
|-id=142 bgcolor=#d6d6d6
| 397142 ||  || — || November 26, 2005 || Kitt Peak || Spacewatch || — || align=right | 3.1 km || 
|-id=143 bgcolor=#d6d6d6
| 397143 ||  || — || November 26, 2005 || Mount Lemmon || Mount Lemmon Survey || — || align=right | 4.6 km || 
|-id=144 bgcolor=#fefefe
| 397144 ||  || — || November 29, 2005 || Kitt Peak || Spacewatch || — || align=right data-sort-value="0.71" | 710 m || 
|-id=145 bgcolor=#d6d6d6
| 397145 ||  || — || November 28, 2005 || Mount Lemmon || Mount Lemmon Survey || — || align=right | 2.2 km || 
|-id=146 bgcolor=#d6d6d6
| 397146 ||  || — || November 28, 2005 || Mount Lemmon || Mount Lemmon Survey || — || align=right | 2.0 km || 
|-id=147 bgcolor=#d6d6d6
| 397147 ||  || — || November 30, 2005 || Kitt Peak || Spacewatch || — || align=right | 2.2 km || 
|-id=148 bgcolor=#d6d6d6
| 397148 ||  || — || November 25, 2005 || Catalina || CSS || — || align=right | 4.6 km || 
|-id=149 bgcolor=#fefefe
| 397149 ||  || — || November 29, 2005 || Catalina || CSS || — || align=right | 2.5 km || 
|-id=150 bgcolor=#fefefe
| 397150 ||  || — || November 26, 2005 || Kitt Peak || Spacewatch || — || align=right data-sort-value="0.57" | 570 m || 
|-id=151 bgcolor=#d6d6d6
| 397151 ||  || — || November 21, 2005 || Kitt Peak || Spacewatch || — || align=right | 4.2 km || 
|-id=152 bgcolor=#d6d6d6
| 397152 ||  || — || December 1, 2005 || Mount Lemmon || Mount Lemmon Survey || — || align=right | 2.7 km || 
|-id=153 bgcolor=#fefefe
| 397153 ||  || — || December 1, 2005 || Kitt Peak || Spacewatch || — || align=right | 1.2 km || 
|-id=154 bgcolor=#fefefe
| 397154 ||  || — || December 5, 2005 || Mount Lemmon || Mount Lemmon Survey || (2076) || align=right data-sort-value="0.98" | 980 m || 
|-id=155 bgcolor=#fefefe
| 397155 ||  || — || December 6, 2005 || Kitt Peak || Spacewatch || — || align=right data-sort-value="0.96" | 960 m || 
|-id=156 bgcolor=#fefefe
| 397156 ||  || — || December 2, 2005 || Kitt Peak || Spacewatch || — || align=right data-sort-value="0.58" | 580 m || 
|-id=157 bgcolor=#d6d6d6
| 397157 ||  || — || December 4, 2005 || Catalina || CSS || Tj (2.96) || align=right | 6.0 km || 
|-id=158 bgcolor=#fefefe
| 397158 ||  || — || December 6, 2005 || Kitt Peak || Spacewatch || — || align=right data-sort-value="0.93" | 930 m || 
|-id=159 bgcolor=#fefefe
| 397159 ||  || — || December 6, 2005 || Kitt Peak || Spacewatch || — || align=right data-sort-value="0.88" | 880 m || 
|-id=160 bgcolor=#fefefe
| 397160 ||  || — || December 1, 2005 || Kitt Peak || M. W. Buie || — || align=right data-sort-value="0.71" | 710 m || 
|-id=161 bgcolor=#d6d6d6
| 397161 ||  || — || December 4, 2005 || Mount Lemmon || Mount Lemmon Survey || — || align=right | 5.4 km || 
|-id=162 bgcolor=#fefefe
| 397162 ||  || — || December 21, 2005 || Kitt Peak || Spacewatch || — || align=right data-sort-value="0.73" | 730 m || 
|-id=163 bgcolor=#fefefe
| 397163 ||  || — || December 24, 2005 || Kitt Peak || Spacewatch || MAS || align=right data-sort-value="0.70" | 700 m || 
|-id=164 bgcolor=#FA8072
| 397164 ||  || — || December 22, 2005 || Catalina || CSS || H || align=right data-sort-value="0.93" | 930 m || 
|-id=165 bgcolor=#fefefe
| 397165 ||  || — || December 24, 2005 || Kitt Peak || Spacewatch || — || align=right data-sort-value="0.59" | 590 m || 
|-id=166 bgcolor=#fefefe
| 397166 ||  || — || November 25, 2005 || Mount Lemmon || Mount Lemmon Survey || — || align=right data-sort-value="0.87" | 870 m || 
|-id=167 bgcolor=#fefefe
| 397167 ||  || — || December 24, 2005 || Kitt Peak || Spacewatch || — || align=right data-sort-value="0.63" | 630 m || 
|-id=168 bgcolor=#fefefe
| 397168 ||  || — || December 25, 2005 || Mount Lemmon || Mount Lemmon Survey || — || align=right data-sort-value="0.68" | 680 m || 
|-id=169 bgcolor=#fefefe
| 397169 ||  || — || December 25, 2005 || Kitt Peak || Spacewatch || NYS || align=right data-sort-value="0.51" | 510 m || 
|-id=170 bgcolor=#fefefe
| 397170 ||  || — || December 25, 2005 || Kitt Peak || Spacewatch || MAS || align=right data-sort-value="0.60" | 600 m || 
|-id=171 bgcolor=#fefefe
| 397171 ||  || — || December 2, 2005 || Mount Lemmon || Mount Lemmon Survey || NYS || align=right data-sort-value="0.66" | 660 m || 
|-id=172 bgcolor=#d6d6d6
| 397172 ||  || — || December 2, 2005 || Mount Lemmon || Mount Lemmon Survey || 3:2 || align=right | 3.5 km || 
|-id=173 bgcolor=#fefefe
| 397173 ||  || — || December 28, 2005 || Mount Lemmon || Mount Lemmon Survey || — || align=right data-sort-value="0.87" | 870 m || 
|-id=174 bgcolor=#fefefe
| 397174 ||  || — || December 25, 2005 || Kitt Peak || Spacewatch || — || align=right data-sort-value="0.78" | 780 m || 
|-id=175 bgcolor=#fefefe
| 397175 ||  || — || December 29, 2005 || Socorro || LINEAR || — || align=right data-sort-value="0.99" | 990 m || 
|-id=176 bgcolor=#fefefe
| 397176 ||  || — || December 26, 2005 || Mount Lemmon || Mount Lemmon Survey || — || align=right data-sort-value="0.69" | 690 m || 
|-id=177 bgcolor=#fefefe
| 397177 ||  || — || December 29, 2005 || Kitt Peak || Spacewatch || MAS || align=right data-sort-value="0.61" | 610 m || 
|-id=178 bgcolor=#fefefe
| 397178 ||  || — || December 30, 2005 || Kitt Peak || Spacewatch || — || align=right data-sort-value="0.90" | 900 m || 
|-id=179 bgcolor=#d6d6d6
| 397179 ||  || — || January 5, 2006 || Socorro || LINEAR || URS || align=right | 5.6 km || 
|-id=180 bgcolor=#fefefe
| 397180 ||  || — || January 5, 2006 || Kitt Peak || Spacewatch || MAS || align=right data-sort-value="0.50" | 500 m || 
|-id=181 bgcolor=#fefefe
| 397181 ||  || — || January 7, 2006 || Mount Lemmon || Mount Lemmon Survey || — || align=right data-sort-value="0.75" | 750 m || 
|-id=182 bgcolor=#d6d6d6
| 397182 ||  || — || January 7, 2006 || Kitt Peak || Spacewatch || — || align=right | 3.7 km || 
|-id=183 bgcolor=#fefefe
| 397183 ||  || — || January 5, 2006 || Kitt Peak || Spacewatch || — || align=right data-sort-value="0.73" | 730 m || 
|-id=184 bgcolor=#E9E9E9
| 397184 ||  || — || November 30, 2005 || Mount Lemmon || Mount Lemmon Survey || — || align=right | 1.2 km || 
|-id=185 bgcolor=#fefefe
| 397185 ||  || — || January 22, 2006 || Mount Lemmon || Mount Lemmon Survey || — || align=right | 1.8 km || 
|-id=186 bgcolor=#fefefe
| 397186 ||  || — || January 22, 2006 || Mount Lemmon || Mount Lemmon Survey || — || align=right data-sort-value="0.87" | 870 m || 
|-id=187 bgcolor=#fefefe
| 397187 ||  || — || January 22, 2006 || Mount Lemmon || Mount Lemmon Survey || — || align=right data-sort-value="0.76" | 760 m || 
|-id=188 bgcolor=#d6d6d6
| 397188 ||  || — || January 21, 2006 || Mount Lemmon || Mount Lemmon Survey || — || align=right | 4.1 km || 
|-id=189 bgcolor=#fefefe
| 397189 ||  || — || January 24, 2006 || Socorro || LINEAR || H || align=right data-sort-value="0.75" | 750 m || 
|-id=190 bgcolor=#d6d6d6
| 397190 ||  || — || January 22, 2006 || Catalina || CSS || — || align=right | 3.4 km || 
|-id=191 bgcolor=#fefefe
| 397191 ||  || — || January 25, 2006 || Kitt Peak || Spacewatch || — || align=right data-sort-value="0.67" | 670 m || 
|-id=192 bgcolor=#fefefe
| 397192 ||  || — || January 26, 2006 || Kitt Peak || Spacewatch || — || align=right data-sort-value="0.71" | 710 m || 
|-id=193 bgcolor=#fefefe
| 397193 ||  || — || January 26, 2006 || Kitt Peak || Spacewatch || NYS || align=right data-sort-value="0.66" | 660 m || 
|-id=194 bgcolor=#fefefe
| 397194 ||  || — || March 26, 1995 || Kitt Peak || Spacewatch || — || align=right data-sort-value="0.78" | 780 m || 
|-id=195 bgcolor=#FA8072
| 397195 ||  || — || January 23, 2006 || Catalina || CSS || PHO || align=right | 1.1 km || 
|-id=196 bgcolor=#d6d6d6
| 397196 ||  || — || January 27, 2006 || Kitt Peak || Spacewatch || — || align=right | 2.9 km || 
|-id=197 bgcolor=#d6d6d6
| 397197 ||  || — || January 30, 2006 || Kitt Peak || Spacewatch || EUP || align=right | 4.1 km || 
|-id=198 bgcolor=#fefefe
| 397198 ||  || — || January 30, 2006 || Kitt Peak || Spacewatch || NYS || align=right data-sort-value="0.53" | 530 m || 
|-id=199 bgcolor=#fefefe
| 397199 ||  || — || January 30, 2006 || Kitt Peak || Spacewatch || NYS || align=right data-sort-value="0.59" | 590 m || 
|-id=200 bgcolor=#fefefe
| 397200 ||  || — || January 31, 2006 || Kitt Peak || Spacewatch || — || align=right data-sort-value="0.71" | 710 m || 
|}

397201–397300 

|-bgcolor=#fefefe
| 397201 ||  || — || January 30, 2006 || Kitt Peak || Spacewatch || — || align=right data-sort-value="0.79" | 790 m || 
|-id=202 bgcolor=#fefefe
| 397202 ||  || — || January 31, 2006 || Mount Lemmon || Mount Lemmon Survey || — || align=right data-sort-value="0.64" | 640 m || 
|-id=203 bgcolor=#fefefe
| 397203 ||  || — || January 30, 2006 || Kitt Peak || Spacewatch || MAS || align=right data-sort-value="0.62" | 620 m || 
|-id=204 bgcolor=#fefefe
| 397204 ||  || — || January 31, 2006 || Kitt Peak || Spacewatch || — || align=right data-sort-value="0.82" | 820 m || 
|-id=205 bgcolor=#fefefe
| 397205 ||  || — || February 1, 2006 || Kitt Peak || Spacewatch || — || align=right data-sort-value="0.73" | 730 m || 
|-id=206 bgcolor=#fefefe
| 397206 ||  || — || January 26, 2006 || Mount Lemmon || Mount Lemmon Survey || — || align=right data-sort-value="0.88" | 880 m || 
|-id=207 bgcolor=#fefefe
| 397207 ||  || — || February 22, 2006 || Anderson Mesa || LONEOS || — || align=right | 2.1 km || 
|-id=208 bgcolor=#fefefe
| 397208 ||  || — || February 27, 2006 || Kitt Peak || Spacewatch || NYS || align=right data-sort-value="0.70" | 700 m || 
|-id=209 bgcolor=#fefefe
| 397209 ||  || — || February 28, 2006 || Mount Lemmon || Mount Lemmon Survey || — || align=right data-sort-value="0.80" | 800 m || 
|-id=210 bgcolor=#fefefe
| 397210 ||  || — || January 26, 2006 || Mount Lemmon || Mount Lemmon Survey || — || align=right data-sort-value="0.94" | 940 m || 
|-id=211 bgcolor=#fefefe
| 397211 ||  || — || March 24, 2006 || Mount Lemmon || Mount Lemmon Survey || — || align=right | 2.0 km || 
|-id=212 bgcolor=#fefefe
| 397212 ||  || — || March 26, 2006 || Anderson Mesa || LONEOS || — || align=right data-sort-value="0.87" | 870 m || 
|-id=213 bgcolor=#fefefe
| 397213 ||  || — || March 26, 2006 || Mount Lemmon || Mount Lemmon Survey || NYS || align=right data-sort-value="0.59" | 590 m || 
|-id=214 bgcolor=#fefefe
| 397214 ||  || — || April 2, 2006 || Kitt Peak || DLS || H || align=right data-sort-value="0.66" | 660 m || 
|-id=215 bgcolor=#d6d6d6
| 397215 ||  || — || March 25, 2006 || Kitt Peak || Spacewatch || 3:2 || align=right | 4.3 km || 
|-id=216 bgcolor=#E9E9E9
| 397216 ||  || — || April 24, 2006 || Kitt Peak || Spacewatch || — || align=right | 1.5 km || 
|-id=217 bgcolor=#fefefe
| 397217 ||  || — || April 24, 2006 || Socorro || LINEAR || — || align=right | 1.3 km || 
|-id=218 bgcolor=#fefefe
| 397218 ||  || — || April 8, 2006 || Kitt Peak || Spacewatch || — || align=right data-sort-value="0.92" | 920 m || 
|-id=219 bgcolor=#E9E9E9
| 397219 ||  || — || April 25, 2006 || Kitt Peak || Spacewatch || — || align=right | 1.3 km || 
|-id=220 bgcolor=#E9E9E9
| 397220 ||  || — || April 25, 2006 || Kitt Peak || Spacewatch || — || align=right data-sort-value="0.98" | 980 m || 
|-id=221 bgcolor=#fefefe
| 397221 ||  || — || April 26, 2006 || Kitt Peak || Spacewatch || NYS || align=right data-sort-value="0.60" | 600 m || 
|-id=222 bgcolor=#E9E9E9
| 397222 ||  || — || April 29, 2006 || Kitt Peak || Spacewatch || — || align=right data-sort-value="0.75" | 750 m || 
|-id=223 bgcolor=#fefefe
| 397223 ||  || — || April 26, 2006 || Kitt Peak || Spacewatch || — || align=right data-sort-value="0.84" | 840 m || 
|-id=224 bgcolor=#E9E9E9
| 397224 ||  || — || May 2, 2006 || Kitt Peak || Spacewatch || MAR || align=right data-sort-value="0.96" | 960 m || 
|-id=225 bgcolor=#E9E9E9
| 397225 ||  || — || May 4, 2006 || Kitt Peak || Spacewatch || — || align=right data-sort-value="0.85" | 850 m || 
|-id=226 bgcolor=#E9E9E9
| 397226 ||  || — || January 15, 2005 || Catalina || CSS || — || align=right | 1.7 km || 
|-id=227 bgcolor=#E9E9E9
| 397227 ||  || — || May 20, 2006 || Kitt Peak || Spacewatch || EUN || align=right | 1.1 km || 
|-id=228 bgcolor=#E9E9E9
| 397228 ||  || — || May 20, 2006 || Mount Lemmon || Mount Lemmon Survey || — || align=right | 1.2 km || 
|-id=229 bgcolor=#E9E9E9
| 397229 ||  || — || May 21, 2006 || Kitt Peak || Spacewatch || — || align=right | 1.3 km || 
|-id=230 bgcolor=#E9E9E9
| 397230 ||  || — || May 22, 2006 || Kitt Peak || Spacewatch || — || align=right data-sort-value="0.85" | 850 m || 
|-id=231 bgcolor=#E9E9E9
| 397231 ||  || — || May 22, 2006 || Kitt Peak || Spacewatch || — || align=right data-sort-value="0.82" | 820 m || 
|-id=232 bgcolor=#E9E9E9
| 397232 ||  || — || May 19, 2006 || Mount Lemmon || Mount Lemmon Survey || — || align=right data-sort-value="0.96" | 960 m || 
|-id=233 bgcolor=#E9E9E9
| 397233 ||  || — || May 29, 2006 || Mayhill || A. Lowe || — || align=right | 3.0 km || 
|-id=234 bgcolor=#E9E9E9
| 397234 ||  || — || May 2, 2006 || Mount Lemmon || Mount Lemmon Survey || — || align=right | 1.4 km || 
|-id=235 bgcolor=#fefefe
| 397235 ||  || — || May 27, 2006 || Catalina || CSS || H || align=right data-sort-value="0.69" | 690 m || 
|-id=236 bgcolor=#FA8072
| 397236 ||  || — || April 20, 2006 || Siding Spring || SSS || — || align=right | 1.3 km || 
|-id=237 bgcolor=#FFC2E0
| 397237 ||  || — || May 31, 2006 || Catalina || CSS || APO +1km || align=right | 1.2 km || 
|-id=238 bgcolor=#E9E9E9
| 397238 ||  || — || May 7, 2006 || Mount Lemmon || Mount Lemmon Survey || — || align=right | 1.0 km || 
|-id=239 bgcolor=#E9E9E9
| 397239 ||  || — || May 29, 2006 || Kitt Peak || Spacewatch || — || align=right | 1.6 km || 
|-id=240 bgcolor=#E9E9E9
| 397240 ||  || — || July 19, 2006 || Palomar || NEAT || JUN || align=right | 1.1 km || 
|-id=241 bgcolor=#FA8072
| 397241 ||  || — || July 21, 2006 || Catalina || CSS || — || align=right | 1.5 km || 
|-id=242 bgcolor=#E9E9E9
| 397242 ||  || — || August 15, 2006 || Palomar || NEAT || — || align=right | 2.0 km || 
|-id=243 bgcolor=#E9E9E9
| 397243 ||  || — || August 13, 2006 || Palomar || NEAT || — || align=right | 1.7 km || 
|-id=244 bgcolor=#E9E9E9
| 397244 ||  || — || August 13, 2006 || Palomar || NEAT || EUN || align=right | 1.3 km || 
|-id=245 bgcolor=#E9E9E9
| 397245 || 2006 QJ || — || August 16, 2006 || Reedy Creek || J. Broughton || TIN || align=right | 2.5 km || 
|-id=246 bgcolor=#E9E9E9
| 397246 ||  || — || August 18, 2006 || Kitt Peak || Spacewatch || HOF || align=right | 2.6 km || 
|-id=247 bgcolor=#E9E9E9
| 397247 ||  || — || August 19, 2006 || Kitt Peak || Spacewatch || — || align=right | 2.5 km || 
|-id=248 bgcolor=#E9E9E9
| 397248 ||  || — || August 19, 2006 || Palomar || NEAT || — || align=right | 2.8 km || 
|-id=249 bgcolor=#E9E9E9
| 397249 ||  || — || August 19, 2006 || Kitt Peak || Spacewatch || — || align=right | 1.6 km || 
|-id=250 bgcolor=#E9E9E9
| 397250 ||  || — || August 8, 2006 || Siding Spring || SSS || — || align=right | 1.8 km || 
|-id=251 bgcolor=#E9E9E9
| 397251 ||  || — || February 5, 2000 || Kitt Peak || Spacewatch || MAR || align=right | 1.1 km || 
|-id=252 bgcolor=#E9E9E9
| 397252 ||  || — || August 16, 2006 || Palomar || NEAT || BRG || align=right | 1.8 km || 
|-id=253 bgcolor=#E9E9E9
| 397253 ||  || — || August 22, 2006 || Palomar || NEAT || — || align=right | 1.5 km || 
|-id=254 bgcolor=#FA8072
| 397254 ||  || — || August 23, 2006 || Palomar || NEAT || — || align=right data-sort-value="0.94" | 940 m || 
|-id=255 bgcolor=#E9E9E9
| 397255 ||  || — || August 27, 2006 || Lulin Observatory || H.-C. Lin, Q.-z. Ye || — || align=right | 1.9 km || 
|-id=256 bgcolor=#d6d6d6
| 397256 ||  || — || August 29, 2006 || Catalina || CSS || — || align=right | 3.1 km || 
|-id=257 bgcolor=#E9E9E9
| 397257 ||  || — || August 19, 2006 || Palomar || NEAT || — || align=right | 2.5 km || 
|-id=258 bgcolor=#E9E9E9
| 397258 ||  || — || August 18, 2006 || Palomar || NEAT || — || align=right | 1.7 km || 
|-id=259 bgcolor=#E9E9E9
| 397259 ||  || — || August 19, 2006 || Kitt Peak || Spacewatch || MIS || align=right | 2.1 km || 
|-id=260 bgcolor=#E9E9E9
| 397260 ||  || — || August 29, 2006 || Anderson Mesa || LONEOS || — || align=right | 2.2 km || 
|-id=261 bgcolor=#E9E9E9
| 397261 ||  || — || September 14, 2006 || Catalina || CSS || — || align=right | 1.6 km || 
|-id=262 bgcolor=#d6d6d6
| 397262 ||  || — || September 14, 2006 || Palomar || NEAT || Tj (2.82) || align=right | 7.8 km || 
|-id=263 bgcolor=#E9E9E9
| 397263 ||  || — || September 14, 2006 || Catalina || CSS || — || align=right | 2.2 km || 
|-id=264 bgcolor=#E9E9E9
| 397264 ||  || — || September 13, 2006 || Palomar || NEAT || (5) || align=right data-sort-value="0.98" | 980 m || 
|-id=265 bgcolor=#E9E9E9
| 397265 ||  || — || September 14, 2006 || Catalina || CSS || — || align=right | 3.1 km || 
|-id=266 bgcolor=#E9E9E9
| 397266 ||  || — || September 12, 2006 || Catalina || CSS || — || align=right | 2.7 km || 
|-id=267 bgcolor=#E9E9E9
| 397267 ||  || — || September 15, 2006 || Kitt Peak || Spacewatch || — || align=right | 2.1 km || 
|-id=268 bgcolor=#E9E9E9
| 397268 ||  || — || September 15, 2006 || Socorro || LINEAR || — || align=right | 1.6 km || 
|-id=269 bgcolor=#E9E9E9
| 397269 ||  || — || July 21, 2006 || Catalina || CSS || EUN || align=right | 1.6 km || 
|-id=270 bgcolor=#E9E9E9
| 397270 ||  || — || September 14, 2006 || Catalina || CSS || — || align=right | 1.1 km || 
|-id=271 bgcolor=#d6d6d6
| 397271 ||  || — || September 15, 2006 || Kitt Peak || Spacewatch || — || align=right | 3.3 km || 
|-id=272 bgcolor=#E9E9E9
| 397272 ||  || — || September 15, 2006 || Kitt Peak || Spacewatch || NEM || align=right | 1.9 km || 
|-id=273 bgcolor=#E9E9E9
| 397273 ||  || — || September 15, 2006 || Kitt Peak || Spacewatch || AGN || align=right data-sort-value="0.90" | 900 m || 
|-id=274 bgcolor=#d6d6d6
| 397274 ||  || — || September 15, 2006 || Kitt Peak || Spacewatch || — || align=right | 2.1 km || 
|-id=275 bgcolor=#E9E9E9
| 397275 ||  || — || September 15, 2006 || Kitt Peak || Spacewatch || — || align=right | 1.9 km || 
|-id=276 bgcolor=#d6d6d6
| 397276 ||  || — || September 15, 2006 || Kitt Peak || Spacewatch || — || align=right | 3.4 km || 
|-id=277 bgcolor=#E9E9E9
| 397277 ||  || — || September 15, 2006 || Kitt Peak || Spacewatch || — || align=right | 1.3 km || 
|-id=278 bgcolor=#E9E9E9
| 397278 Arvidson ||  ||  || September 14, 2006 || Mauna Kea || J. Masiero || — || align=right | 2.1 km || 
|-id=279 bgcolor=#d6d6d6
| 397279 Bloomsburg ||  ||  || September 14, 2006 || Mauna Kea || J. Masiero || — || align=right | 1.9 km || 
|-id=280 bgcolor=#E9E9E9
| 397280 ||  || — || May 2, 2006 || Mount Lemmon || Mount Lemmon Survey || EUN || align=right | 1.4 km || 
|-id=281 bgcolor=#E9E9E9
| 397281 ||  || — || September 17, 2006 || Kitt Peak || Spacewatch || — || align=right | 2.7 km || 
|-id=282 bgcolor=#E9E9E9
| 397282 ||  || — || September 18, 2006 || Kitt Peak || Spacewatch || — || align=right | 1.9 km || 
|-id=283 bgcolor=#E9E9E9
| 397283 ||  || — || September 18, 2006 || Catalina || CSS || — || align=right | 2.4 km || 
|-id=284 bgcolor=#E9E9E9
| 397284 ||  || — || September 19, 2006 || Kitt Peak || Spacewatch || — || align=right | 2.7 km || 
|-id=285 bgcolor=#E9E9E9
| 397285 ||  || — || September 17, 2006 || Catalina || CSS || — || align=right | 2.7 km || 
|-id=286 bgcolor=#E9E9E9
| 397286 ||  || — || September 17, 2006 || Catalina || CSS || — || align=right | 2.5 km || 
|-id=287 bgcolor=#FA8072
| 397287 ||  || — || September 16, 2006 || Catalina || CSS || — || align=right | 1.9 km || 
|-id=288 bgcolor=#E9E9E9
| 397288 ||  || — || September 17, 2006 || Catalina || CSS || JUN || align=right | 1.5 km || 
|-id=289 bgcolor=#E9E9E9
| 397289 ||  || — || September 18, 2006 || Kitt Peak || Spacewatch || HOF || align=right | 2.0 km || 
|-id=290 bgcolor=#E9E9E9
| 397290 ||  || — || September 18, 2006 || Kitt Peak || Spacewatch || — || align=right | 2.5 km || 
|-id=291 bgcolor=#d6d6d6
| 397291 ||  || — || September 18, 2006 || Kitt Peak || Spacewatch || — || align=right | 2.5 km || 
|-id=292 bgcolor=#E9E9E9
| 397292 ||  || — || September 19, 2006 || Kitt Peak || Spacewatch || EUN || align=right | 1.1 km || 
|-id=293 bgcolor=#E9E9E9
| 397293 ||  || — || September 22, 2006 || Catalina || CSS || — || align=right | 1.9 km || 
|-id=294 bgcolor=#E9E9E9
| 397294 ||  || — || September 19, 2006 || Catalina || CSS || — || align=right | 2.6 km || 
|-id=295 bgcolor=#E9E9E9
| 397295 ||  || — || September 20, 2006 || Catalina || CSS || — || align=right | 1.9 km || 
|-id=296 bgcolor=#E9E9E9
| 397296 ||  || — || September 19, 2006 || Kitt Peak || Spacewatch || — || align=right | 1.9 km || 
|-id=297 bgcolor=#E9E9E9
| 397297 ||  || — || September 25, 2006 || Kitt Peak || Spacewatch || — || align=right | 2.1 km || 
|-id=298 bgcolor=#d6d6d6
| 397298 ||  || — || September 25, 2006 || Kitt Peak || Spacewatch || 3:2 || align=right | 5.3 km || 
|-id=299 bgcolor=#E9E9E9
| 397299 ||  || — || September 25, 2006 || Mount Lemmon || Mount Lemmon Survey || — || align=right | 1.9 km || 
|-id=300 bgcolor=#E9E9E9
| 397300 ||  || — || September 24, 2006 || Kitt Peak || Spacewatch || GEF || align=right | 1.2 km || 
|}

397301–397400 

|-bgcolor=#E9E9E9
| 397301 ||  || — || September 24, 2006 || Kitt Peak || Spacewatch || — || align=right | 1.1 km || 
|-id=302 bgcolor=#E9E9E9
| 397302 ||  || — || September 27, 2006 || Kitt Peak || Spacewatch || — || align=right | 2.0 km || 
|-id=303 bgcolor=#E9E9E9
| 397303 ||  || — || September 26, 2006 || Kitt Peak || Spacewatch || — || align=right | 2.2 km || 
|-id=304 bgcolor=#E9E9E9
| 397304 ||  || — || September 26, 2006 || Kitt Peak || Spacewatch || — || align=right | 1.9 km || 
|-id=305 bgcolor=#E9E9E9
| 397305 ||  || — || September 26, 2006 || Kitt Peak || Spacewatch || — || align=right | 2.2 km || 
|-id=306 bgcolor=#E9E9E9
| 397306 ||  || — || September 26, 2006 || Mount Lemmon || Mount Lemmon Survey || — || align=right | 1.4 km || 
|-id=307 bgcolor=#E9E9E9
| 397307 ||  || — || September 26, 2006 || Mount Lemmon || Mount Lemmon Survey || — || align=right | 2.2 km || 
|-id=308 bgcolor=#E9E9E9
| 397308 ||  || — || September 26, 2006 || Mount Lemmon || Mount Lemmon Survey || — || align=right | 2.2 km || 
|-id=309 bgcolor=#E9E9E9
| 397309 ||  || — || September 26, 2006 || Kitt Peak || Spacewatch || — || align=right | 1.4 km || 
|-id=310 bgcolor=#d6d6d6
| 397310 ||  || — || September 26, 2006 || Kitt Peak || Spacewatch || EOS || align=right | 2.2 km || 
|-id=311 bgcolor=#E9E9E9
| 397311 ||  || — || September 27, 2006 || Mount Lemmon || Mount Lemmon Survey || — || align=right | 1.2 km || 
|-id=312 bgcolor=#E9E9E9
| 397312 ||  || — || September 30, 2006 || Anderson Mesa || LONEOS || JUN || align=right | 1.2 km || 
|-id=313 bgcolor=#E9E9E9
| 397313 ||  || — || September 28, 2006 || Mount Lemmon || Mount Lemmon Survey || AGN || align=right | 1.2 km || 
|-id=314 bgcolor=#E9E9E9
| 397314 ||  || — || September 30, 2006 || Mount Lemmon || Mount Lemmon Survey || — || align=right | 1.7 km || 
|-id=315 bgcolor=#E9E9E9
| 397315 ||  || — || September 16, 2006 || Catalina || CSS || EUN || align=right | 1.4 km || 
|-id=316 bgcolor=#E9E9E9
| 397316 ||  || — || September 28, 2006 || Apache Point || A. C. Becker || — || align=right | 2.1 km || 
|-id=317 bgcolor=#E9E9E9
| 397317 ||  || — || September 29, 2006 || Apache Point || A. C. Becker || — || align=right | 2.1 km || 
|-id=318 bgcolor=#E9E9E9
| 397318 ||  || — || September 30, 2006 || Apache Point || A. C. Becker || — || align=right | 2.8 km || 
|-id=319 bgcolor=#E9E9E9
| 397319 ||  || — || September 17, 2006 || Kitt Peak || Spacewatch || — || align=right | 1.9 km || 
|-id=320 bgcolor=#d6d6d6
| 397320 ||  || — || September 25, 2006 || Kitt Peak || Spacewatch || — || align=right | 2.0 km || 
|-id=321 bgcolor=#E9E9E9
| 397321 ||  || — || September 27, 2006 || Kitt Peak || Spacewatch || — || align=right | 2.0 km || 
|-id=322 bgcolor=#d6d6d6
| 397322 ||  || — || September 30, 2006 || Kitt Peak || Spacewatch || EMA || align=right | 3.1 km || 
|-id=323 bgcolor=#E9E9E9
| 397323 ||  || — || September 18, 2006 || Kitt Peak || Spacewatch || — || align=right | 2.0 km || 
|-id=324 bgcolor=#E9E9E9
| 397324 ||  || — || September 19, 2006 || Catalina || CSS || — || align=right | 2.6 km || 
|-id=325 bgcolor=#E9E9E9
| 397325 ||  || — || October 2, 2006 || Mayhill || A. Lowe || — || align=right | 2.7 km || 
|-id=326 bgcolor=#FFC2E0
| 397326 ||  || — || October 3, 2006 || Mount Lemmon || Mount Lemmon Survey || AMO || align=right data-sort-value="0.59" | 590 m || 
|-id=327 bgcolor=#d6d6d6
| 397327 ||  || — || October 11, 2006 || Kitt Peak || Spacewatch || EUP || align=right | 3.1 km || 
|-id=328 bgcolor=#E9E9E9
| 397328 ||  || — || October 11, 2006 || Kitt Peak || Spacewatch || — || align=right | 1.2 km || 
|-id=329 bgcolor=#E9E9E9
| 397329 ||  || — || October 12, 2006 || Kitt Peak || Spacewatch || — || align=right | 1.9 km || 
|-id=330 bgcolor=#d6d6d6
| 397330 ||  || — || September 26, 2006 || Mount Lemmon || Mount Lemmon Survey || — || align=right | 2.0 km || 
|-id=331 bgcolor=#E9E9E9
| 397331 ||  || — || October 12, 2006 || Palomar || NEAT || JUN || align=right | 1.5 km || 
|-id=332 bgcolor=#E9E9E9
| 397332 ||  || — || September 20, 2006 || Anderson Mesa || LONEOS || — || align=right | 2.5 km || 
|-id=333 bgcolor=#E9E9E9
| 397333 ||  || — || October 10, 2006 || Palomar || NEAT || — || align=right | 1.6 km || 
|-id=334 bgcolor=#d6d6d6
| 397334 ||  || — || September 17, 2006 || Catalina || CSS || — || align=right | 3.7 km || 
|-id=335 bgcolor=#E9E9E9
| 397335 ||  || — || October 11, 2006 || Kitt Peak || Spacewatch || — || align=right | 2.4 km || 
|-id=336 bgcolor=#E9E9E9
| 397336 ||  || — || October 11, 2006 || Palomar || NEAT || — || align=right | 3.4 km || 
|-id=337 bgcolor=#E9E9E9
| 397337 ||  || — || October 11, 2006 || Palomar || NEAT || — || align=right | 2.4 km || 
|-id=338 bgcolor=#E9E9E9
| 397338 ||  || — || October 11, 2006 || Palomar || NEAT || — || align=right | 2.6 km || 
|-id=339 bgcolor=#FA8072
| 397339 ||  || — || October 13, 2006 || Kitt Peak || Spacewatch || — || align=right | 1.3 km || 
|-id=340 bgcolor=#E9E9E9
| 397340 ||  || — || October 13, 2006 || Kitt Peak || Spacewatch || — || align=right | 1.6 km || 
|-id=341 bgcolor=#E9E9E9
| 397341 ||  || — || October 12, 2006 || Palomar || NEAT || JUN || align=right | 1.4 km || 
|-id=342 bgcolor=#E9E9E9
| 397342 ||  || — || October 4, 2006 || Mount Lemmon || Mount Lemmon Survey || — || align=right | 2.4 km || 
|-id=343 bgcolor=#E9E9E9
| 397343 ||  || — || September 30, 2006 || Anderson Mesa || LONEOS || — || align=right | 1.9 km || 
|-id=344 bgcolor=#E9E9E9
| 397344 ||  || — || October 17, 2006 || Mount Lemmon || Mount Lemmon Survey || EUN || align=right | 1.5 km || 
|-id=345 bgcolor=#d6d6d6
| 397345 ||  || — || October 3, 2006 || Mount Lemmon || Mount Lemmon Survey || KOR || align=right | 1.2 km || 
|-id=346 bgcolor=#E9E9E9
| 397346 ||  || — || October 16, 2006 || Kitt Peak || Spacewatch || — || align=right | 2.3 km || 
|-id=347 bgcolor=#E9E9E9
| 397347 ||  || — || October 17, 2006 || Kitami || K. Endate || — || align=right | 3.2 km || 
|-id=348 bgcolor=#d6d6d6
| 397348 ||  || — || September 16, 2006 || Catalina || CSS || — || align=right | 3.9 km || 
|-id=349 bgcolor=#E9E9E9
| 397349 ||  || — || October 16, 2006 || Catalina || CSS || JUN || align=right | 1.2 km || 
|-id=350 bgcolor=#E9E9E9
| 397350 ||  || — || October 17, 2006 || Mount Lemmon || Mount Lemmon Survey || — || align=right | 1.5 km || 
|-id=351 bgcolor=#d6d6d6
| 397351 ||  || — || October 17, 2006 || Mount Lemmon || Mount Lemmon Survey || — || align=right | 3.0 km || 
|-id=352 bgcolor=#E9E9E9
| 397352 ||  || — || October 17, 2006 || Kitt Peak || Spacewatch ||  || align=right | 2.1 km || 
|-id=353 bgcolor=#E9E9E9
| 397353 ||  || — || October 17, 2006 || Kitt Peak || Spacewatch || — || align=right | 1.6 km || 
|-id=354 bgcolor=#E9E9E9
| 397354 ||  || — || October 18, 2006 || Kitt Peak || Spacewatch || — || align=right | 1.8 km || 
|-id=355 bgcolor=#d6d6d6
| 397355 ||  || — || October 18, 2006 || Kitt Peak || Spacewatch || EOS || align=right | 2.3 km || 
|-id=356 bgcolor=#d6d6d6
| 397356 ||  || — || October 18, 2006 || Kitt Peak || Spacewatch || BRA || align=right | 1.6 km || 
|-id=357 bgcolor=#E9E9E9
| 397357 ||  || — || October 18, 2006 || Kitt Peak || Spacewatch || — || align=right | 1.9 km || 
|-id=358 bgcolor=#d6d6d6
| 397358 ||  || — || September 18, 2006 || Kitt Peak || Spacewatch || — || align=right | 1.9 km || 
|-id=359 bgcolor=#d6d6d6
| 397359 ||  || — || October 19, 2006 || Kitt Peak || Spacewatch || — || align=right | 2.5 km || 
|-id=360 bgcolor=#FA8072
| 397360 ||  || — || October 19, 2006 || Catalina || CSS || — || align=right data-sort-value="0.87" | 870 m || 
|-id=361 bgcolor=#E9E9E9
| 397361 ||  || — || September 27, 2006 || Mount Lemmon || Mount Lemmon Survey || HOF || align=right | 2.4 km || 
|-id=362 bgcolor=#d6d6d6
| 397362 ||  || — || October 19, 2006 || Kitt Peak || Spacewatch || NAE || align=right | 3.3 km || 
|-id=363 bgcolor=#E9E9E9
| 397363 ||  || — || October 21, 2006 || Catalina || CSS || — || align=right | 2.7 km || 
|-id=364 bgcolor=#E9E9E9
| 397364 ||  || — || October 16, 2006 || Catalina || CSS || — || align=right | 1.8 km || 
|-id=365 bgcolor=#E9E9E9
| 397365 ||  || — || October 16, 2006 || Catalina || CSS || — || align=right | 2.0 km || 
|-id=366 bgcolor=#E9E9E9
| 397366 ||  || — || October 22, 2006 || Palomar || NEAT || — || align=right | 3.2 km || 
|-id=367 bgcolor=#E9E9E9
| 397367 ||  || — || October 22, 2006 || Palomar || NEAT || — || align=right | 2.1 km || 
|-id=368 bgcolor=#d6d6d6
| 397368 ||  || — || October 23, 2006 || Kitt Peak || Spacewatch || EOS || align=right | 2.2 km || 
|-id=369 bgcolor=#E9E9E9
| 397369 ||  || — || October 19, 2006 || Palomar || NEAT || — || align=right | 2.1 km || 
|-id=370 bgcolor=#E9E9E9
| 397370 ||  || — || October 27, 2006 || Kitt Peak || Spacewatch || — || align=right | 1.6 km || 
|-id=371 bgcolor=#E9E9E9
| 397371 ||  || — || October 27, 2006 || Mount Lemmon || Mount Lemmon Survey || — || align=right | 1.7 km || 
|-id=372 bgcolor=#E9E9E9
| 397372 ||  || — || October 30, 2006 || Marly || Naef Obs. || — || align=right | 2.6 km || 
|-id=373 bgcolor=#E9E9E9
| 397373 ||  || — || October 27, 2006 || Mount Lemmon || Mount Lemmon Survey || — || align=right | 2.4 km || 
|-id=374 bgcolor=#E9E9E9
| 397374 ||  || — || October 19, 2006 || Kitt Peak || Spacewatch || HOF || align=right | 2.4 km || 
|-id=375 bgcolor=#E9E9E9
| 397375 ||  || — || October 17, 2006 || Mount Lemmon || Mount Lemmon Survey || — || align=right | 3.7 km || 
|-id=376 bgcolor=#E9E9E9
| 397376 ||  || — || October 17, 2006 || Kitt Peak || Spacewatch || — || align=right | 2.9 km || 
|-id=377 bgcolor=#E9E9E9
| 397377 ||  || — || October 22, 2006 || Catalina || CSS || — || align=right | 1.9 km || 
|-id=378 bgcolor=#d6d6d6
| 397378 ||  || — || October 28, 2006 || Mount Lemmon || Mount Lemmon Survey || — || align=right | 3.3 km || 
|-id=379 bgcolor=#d6d6d6
| 397379 ||  || — || October 16, 2006 || Kitt Peak || Spacewatch || KOR || align=right | 1.1 km || 
|-id=380 bgcolor=#E9E9E9
| 397380 ||  || — || September 25, 2006 || Mount Lemmon || Mount Lemmon Survey || — || align=right | 2.4 km || 
|-id=381 bgcolor=#d6d6d6
| 397381 ||  || — || October 16, 2006 || Catalina || CSS || — || align=right | 3.7 km || 
|-id=382 bgcolor=#d6d6d6
| 397382 ||  || — || October 22, 2006 || Kitt Peak || Spacewatch || — || align=right | 2.2 km || 
|-id=383 bgcolor=#d6d6d6
| 397383 ||  || — || September 30, 2006 || Mount Lemmon || Mount Lemmon Survey || — || align=right | 3.5 km || 
|-id=384 bgcolor=#d6d6d6
| 397384 ||  || — || November 11, 2006 || Kitt Peak || Spacewatch || — || align=right | 2.5 km || 
|-id=385 bgcolor=#d6d6d6
| 397385 ||  || — || November 11, 2006 || Kitt Peak || Spacewatch || EOS || align=right | 1.6 km || 
|-id=386 bgcolor=#d6d6d6
| 397386 ||  || — || October 22, 2006 || Mount Lemmon || Mount Lemmon Survey || — || align=right | 2.8 km || 
|-id=387 bgcolor=#d6d6d6
| 397387 ||  || — || October 4, 2006 || Mount Lemmon || Mount Lemmon Survey || — || align=right | 3.0 km || 
|-id=388 bgcolor=#d6d6d6
| 397388 ||  || — || September 28, 2006 || Mount Lemmon || Mount Lemmon Survey || NAE || align=right | 2.6 km || 
|-id=389 bgcolor=#d6d6d6
| 397389 ||  || — || November 11, 2006 || Kitt Peak || Spacewatch || — || align=right | 3.0 km || 
|-id=390 bgcolor=#d6d6d6
| 397390 ||  || — || November 12, 2006 || Mount Lemmon || Mount Lemmon Survey || BRA || align=right | 1.5 km || 
|-id=391 bgcolor=#E9E9E9
| 397391 ||  || — || November 11, 2006 || Kitt Peak || Spacewatch || — || align=right | 1.6 km || 
|-id=392 bgcolor=#E9E9E9
| 397392 ||  || — || November 11, 2006 || Catalina || CSS || — || align=right | 3.9 km || 
|-id=393 bgcolor=#E9E9E9
| 397393 ||  || — || November 13, 2006 || Kitt Peak || Spacewatch || — || align=right | 2.5 km || 
|-id=394 bgcolor=#E9E9E9
| 397394 ||  || — || November 13, 2006 || Catalina || CSS || — || align=right | 2.9 km || 
|-id=395 bgcolor=#E9E9E9
| 397395 ||  || — || November 14, 2006 || Kitt Peak || Spacewatch || — || align=right | 1.6 km || 
|-id=396 bgcolor=#d6d6d6
| 397396 ||  || — || November 15, 2006 || Kitt Peak || Spacewatch || — || align=right | 2.0 km || 
|-id=397 bgcolor=#E9E9E9
| 397397 ||  || — || November 17, 2006 || Kitt Peak || Spacewatch || — || align=right | 2.0 km || 
|-id=398 bgcolor=#E9E9E9
| 397398 ||  || — || November 16, 2006 || Kitt Peak || Spacewatch || — || align=right | 2.8 km || 
|-id=399 bgcolor=#d6d6d6
| 397399 ||  || — || November 17, 2006 || Mount Lemmon || Mount Lemmon Survey || — || align=right | 2.5 km || 
|-id=400 bgcolor=#d6d6d6
| 397400 ||  || — || October 31, 2006 || Mount Lemmon || Mount Lemmon Survey || KOR || align=right | 1.4 km || 
|}

397401–397500 

|-bgcolor=#d6d6d6
| 397401 ||  || — || November 18, 2006 || Kitt Peak || Spacewatch || KOR || align=right | 1.1 km || 
|-id=402 bgcolor=#d6d6d6
| 397402 ||  || — || November 19, 2006 || Kitt Peak || Spacewatch || EOS || align=right | 1.6 km || 
|-id=403 bgcolor=#d6d6d6
| 397403 ||  || — || November 19, 2006 || Kitt Peak || Spacewatch || EOS || align=right | 1.6 km || 
|-id=404 bgcolor=#d6d6d6
| 397404 ||  || — || November 20, 2006 || Kitt Peak || Spacewatch || — || align=right | 3.4 km || 
|-id=405 bgcolor=#d6d6d6
| 397405 ||  || — || November 15, 2006 || Kitt Peak || Spacewatch || — || align=right | 2.2 km || 
|-id=406 bgcolor=#d6d6d6
| 397406 ||  || — || November 23, 2006 || Kitt Peak || Spacewatch || — || align=right | 2.6 km || 
|-id=407 bgcolor=#E9E9E9
| 397407 ||  || — || November 25, 2006 || Mount Lemmon || Mount Lemmon Survey || — || align=right | 3.3 km || 
|-id=408 bgcolor=#d6d6d6
| 397408 ||  || — || November 19, 2006 || Kitt Peak || Spacewatch || — || align=right | 3.0 km || 
|-id=409 bgcolor=#E9E9E9
| 397409 ||  || — || December 12, 2006 || Catalina || CSS || — || align=right | 1.7 km || 
|-id=410 bgcolor=#d6d6d6
| 397410 ||  || — || December 11, 2006 || Kitt Peak || Spacewatch || — || align=right | 4.6 km || 
|-id=411 bgcolor=#d6d6d6
| 397411 ||  || — || November 16, 2006 || Mount Lemmon || Mount Lemmon Survey || — || align=right | 3.2 km || 
|-id=412 bgcolor=#d6d6d6
| 397412 ||  || — || October 23, 2006 || Mount Lemmon || Mount Lemmon Survey || URS || align=right | 3.2 km || 
|-id=413 bgcolor=#d6d6d6
| 397413 ||  || — || December 21, 2006 || Kitt Peak || Spacewatch || EOS || align=right | 2.2 km || 
|-id=414 bgcolor=#d6d6d6
| 397414 ||  || — || December 21, 2006 || Kitt Peak || Spacewatch || — || align=right | 3.4 km || 
|-id=415 bgcolor=#d6d6d6
| 397415 ||  || — || December 21, 2006 || Kitt Peak || Spacewatch || — || align=right | 2.9 km || 
|-id=416 bgcolor=#d6d6d6
| 397416 ||  || — || December 21, 2006 || Kitt Peak || Spacewatch || — || align=right | 2.3 km || 
|-id=417 bgcolor=#d6d6d6
| 397417 ||  || — || December 21, 2006 || Kitt Peak || Spacewatch || THB || align=right | 3.5 km || 
|-id=418 bgcolor=#d6d6d6
| 397418 ||  || — || December 22, 2006 || Kitt Peak || Spacewatch || EOS || align=right | 2.0 km || 
|-id=419 bgcolor=#E9E9E9
| 397419 ||  || — || December 23, 2006 || Catalina || CSS || GAL || align=right | 1.9 km || 
|-id=420 bgcolor=#fefefe
| 397420 ||  || — || December 21, 2006 || Kitt Peak || M. W. Buie || — || align=right data-sort-value="0.73" | 730 m || 
|-id=421 bgcolor=#d6d6d6
| 397421 ||  || — || October 29, 2005 || Catalina || CSS || — || align=right | 4.1 km || 
|-id=422 bgcolor=#d6d6d6
| 397422 ||  || — || November 1, 2006 || Mount Lemmon || Mount Lemmon Survey || — || align=right | 3.2 km || 
|-id=423 bgcolor=#d6d6d6
| 397423 ||  || — || January 9, 2007 || Kitt Peak || Spacewatch || — || align=right | 3.3 km || 
|-id=424 bgcolor=#fefefe
| 397424 ||  || — || January 16, 2007 || Catalina || CSS || H || align=right data-sort-value="0.90" | 900 m || 
|-id=425 bgcolor=#d6d6d6
| 397425 ||  || — || January 17, 2007 || Kitt Peak || Spacewatch || TIR || align=right | 2.7 km || 
|-id=426 bgcolor=#d6d6d6
| 397426 ||  || — || January 17, 2007 || Kitt Peak || Spacewatch || — || align=right | 2.9 km || 
|-id=427 bgcolor=#d6d6d6
| 397427 ||  || — || January 17, 2007 || Kitt Peak || Spacewatch || — || align=right | 4.4 km || 
|-id=428 bgcolor=#fefefe
| 397428 ||  || — || January 24, 2007 || Mount Lemmon || Mount Lemmon Survey || — || align=right data-sort-value="0.64" | 640 m || 
|-id=429 bgcolor=#d6d6d6
| 397429 ||  || — || January 17, 2007 || Kitt Peak || Spacewatch || VER || align=right | 2.6 km || 
|-id=430 bgcolor=#d6d6d6
| 397430 ||  || — || February 9, 2007 || Catalina || CSS || EOS || align=right | 2.4 km || 
|-id=431 bgcolor=#E9E9E9
| 397431 ||  || — || November 27, 2006 || Mount Lemmon || Mount Lemmon Survey || — || align=right | 2.0 km || 
|-id=432 bgcolor=#d6d6d6
| 397432 ||  || — || January 27, 2007 || Kitt Peak || Spacewatch || — || align=right | 3.1 km || 
|-id=433 bgcolor=#d6d6d6
| 397433 ||  || — || February 10, 2007 || Catalina || CSS || — || align=right | 4.3 km || 
|-id=434 bgcolor=#fefefe
| 397434 ||  || — || February 17, 2007 || Kitt Peak || Spacewatch || — || align=right data-sort-value="0.65" | 650 m || 
|-id=435 bgcolor=#d6d6d6
| 397435 ||  || — || December 21, 2006 || Mount Lemmon || Mount Lemmon Survey || — || align=right | 3.3 km || 
|-id=436 bgcolor=#d6d6d6
| 397436 ||  || — || February 6, 2007 || Kitt Peak || Spacewatch || — || align=right | 3.9 km || 
|-id=437 bgcolor=#fefefe
| 397437 ||  || — || February 19, 2007 || Catalina || CSS || PHO || align=right | 1.1 km || 
|-id=438 bgcolor=#d6d6d6
| 397438 ||  || — || February 23, 2007 || Kitt Peak || Spacewatch || — || align=right | 2.6 km || 
|-id=439 bgcolor=#fefefe
| 397439 ||  || — || February 21, 2007 || Kitt Peak || Spacewatch || — || align=right data-sort-value="0.82" | 820 m || 
|-id=440 bgcolor=#d6d6d6
| 397440 ||  || — || January 28, 2007 || Mount Lemmon || Mount Lemmon Survey || THM || align=right | 2.5 km || 
|-id=441 bgcolor=#FA8072
| 397441 ||  || — || January 20, 2007 || Siding Spring || SSS || — || align=right | 1.2 km || 
|-id=442 bgcolor=#fefefe
| 397442 ||  || — || January 29, 2007 || Kitt Peak || Spacewatch || — || align=right data-sort-value="0.63" | 630 m || 
|-id=443 bgcolor=#fefefe
| 397443 ||  || — || March 9, 2007 || Mount Lemmon || Mount Lemmon Survey || — || align=right data-sort-value="0.71" | 710 m || 
|-id=444 bgcolor=#d6d6d6
| 397444 ||  || — || January 27, 2007 || Mount Lemmon || Mount Lemmon Survey || — || align=right | 2.8 km || 
|-id=445 bgcolor=#fefefe
| 397445 ||  || — || March 9, 2007 || Kitt Peak || Spacewatch || — || align=right data-sort-value="0.94" | 940 m || 
|-id=446 bgcolor=#d6d6d6
| 397446 ||  || — || March 10, 2007 || Kitt Peak || Spacewatch || — || align=right | 3.5 km || 
|-id=447 bgcolor=#fefefe
| 397447 ||  || — || March 11, 2007 || Kitt Peak || Spacewatch || — || align=right data-sort-value="0.69" | 690 m || 
|-id=448 bgcolor=#fefefe
| 397448 ||  || — || March 14, 2007 || Mount Lemmon || Mount Lemmon Survey || — || align=right data-sort-value="0.81" | 810 m || 
|-id=449 bgcolor=#fefefe
| 397449 ||  || — || March 12, 2007 || Mount Lemmon || Mount Lemmon Survey || — || align=right data-sort-value="0.72" | 720 m || 
|-id=450 bgcolor=#d6d6d6
| 397450 ||  || — || February 26, 2007 || Mount Lemmon || Mount Lemmon Survey || — || align=right | 2.8 km || 
|-id=451 bgcolor=#d6d6d6
| 397451 ||  || — || March 13, 2007 || Mount Lemmon || Mount Lemmon Survey || — || align=right | 3.2 km || 
|-id=452 bgcolor=#fefefe
| 397452 ||  || — || March 15, 2007 || Kitt Peak || Spacewatch || — || align=right data-sort-value="0.66" | 660 m || 
|-id=453 bgcolor=#fefefe
| 397453 ||  || — || March 17, 2007 || Anderson Mesa || LONEOS || — || align=right data-sort-value="0.68" | 680 m || 
|-id=454 bgcolor=#fefefe
| 397454 ||  || — || March 17, 2007 || Socorro || LINEAR || — || align=right | 2.1 km || 
|-id=455 bgcolor=#fefefe
| 397455 ||  || — || March 20, 2007 || Kitt Peak || Spacewatch || — || align=right data-sort-value="0.76" | 760 m || 
|-id=456 bgcolor=#fefefe
| 397456 ||  || — || April 14, 2007 || Altschwendt || W. Ries || — || align=right | 1.6 km || 
|-id=457 bgcolor=#fefefe
| 397457 ||  || — || November 6, 2002 || Kitt Peak || Spacewatch || — || align=right data-sort-value="0.91" | 910 m || 
|-id=458 bgcolor=#fefefe
| 397458 ||  || — || April 15, 2007 || Kitt Peak || Spacewatch || — || align=right data-sort-value="0.64" | 640 m || 
|-id=459 bgcolor=#fefefe
| 397459 ||  || — || March 14, 2007 || Mount Lemmon || Mount Lemmon Survey || — || align=right data-sort-value="0.87" | 870 m || 
|-id=460 bgcolor=#d6d6d6
| 397460 ||  || — || March 14, 2007 || Kitt Peak || Spacewatch || EUP || align=right | 4.0 km || 
|-id=461 bgcolor=#fefefe
| 397461 ||  || — || April 18, 2007 || Kitt Peak || Spacewatch || — || align=right data-sort-value="0.75" | 750 m || 
|-id=462 bgcolor=#fefefe
| 397462 ||  || — || April 19, 2007 || Kitt Peak || Spacewatch || — || align=right data-sort-value="0.96" | 960 m || 
|-id=463 bgcolor=#fefefe
| 397463 ||  || — || November 1, 2005 || Mount Lemmon || Mount Lemmon Survey || — || align=right data-sort-value="0.89" | 890 m || 
|-id=464 bgcolor=#fefefe
| 397464 ||  || — || April 20, 2007 || Kitt Peak || Spacewatch || — || align=right data-sort-value="0.87" | 870 m || 
|-id=465 bgcolor=#fefefe
| 397465 ||  || — || April 20, 2007 || Kitt Peak || Spacewatch || — || align=right data-sort-value="0.71" | 710 m || 
|-id=466 bgcolor=#fefefe
| 397466 ||  || — || April 22, 2007 || Mount Lemmon || Mount Lemmon Survey || — || align=right data-sort-value="0.65" | 650 m || 
|-id=467 bgcolor=#fefefe
| 397467 ||  || — || April 22, 2007 || Mount Lemmon || Mount Lemmon Survey || — || align=right data-sort-value="0.69" | 690 m || 
|-id=468 bgcolor=#fefefe
| 397468 ||  || — || October 21, 2001 || Kitt Peak || Spacewatch || — || align=right data-sort-value="0.62" | 620 m || 
|-id=469 bgcolor=#fefefe
| 397469 ||  || — || April 11, 2007 || Kitt Peak || Spacewatch || — || align=right data-sort-value="0.81" | 810 m || 
|-id=470 bgcolor=#fefefe
| 397470 ||  || — || April 15, 1993 || Kitt Peak || Spacewatch || — || align=right data-sort-value="0.87" | 870 m || 
|-id=471 bgcolor=#FFC2E0
| 397471 ||  || — || June 9, 2007 || Siding Spring || SSS || AMO +1km || align=right data-sort-value="0.85" | 850 m || 
|-id=472 bgcolor=#FA8072
| 397472 ||  || — || June 19, 2007 || Kitt Peak || Spacewatch || — || align=right | 1.2 km || 
|-id=473 bgcolor=#FA8072
| 397473 ||  || — || June 18, 2007 || Catalina || CSS || — || align=right | 1.1 km || 
|-id=474 bgcolor=#FFC2E0
| 397474 ||  || — || August 9, 2007 || Siding Spring || SSS || APO +1kmcritical || align=right | 1.2 km || 
|-id=475 bgcolor=#fefefe
| 397475 ||  || — || August 9, 2007 || Socorro || LINEAR || — || align=right | 1.1 km || 
|-id=476 bgcolor=#fefefe
| 397476 ||  || — || August 13, 2007 || Socorro || LINEAR || (5026) || align=right data-sort-value="0.98" | 980 m || 
|-id=477 bgcolor=#fefefe
| 397477 ||  || — || August 9, 2007 || Kitt Peak || Spacewatch || MAS || align=right data-sort-value="0.83" | 830 m || 
|-id=478 bgcolor=#fefefe
| 397478 ||  || — || August 9, 2007 || Kitt Peak || Spacewatch || MAS || align=right data-sort-value="0.82" | 820 m || 
|-id=479 bgcolor=#fefefe
| 397479 ||  || — || August 18, 2007 || La Sagra || OAM Obs. || — || align=right | 1.0 km || 
|-id=480 bgcolor=#fefefe
| 397480 ||  || — || August 10, 2007 || Kitt Peak || Spacewatch || — || align=right data-sort-value="0.94" | 940 m || 
|-id=481 bgcolor=#fefefe
| 397481 ||  || — || August 21, 2007 || Anderson Mesa || LONEOS || NYS || align=right data-sort-value="0.63" | 630 m || 
|-id=482 bgcolor=#fefefe
| 397482 ||  || — || August 21, 2007 || Anderson Mesa || LONEOS || — || align=right data-sort-value="0.86" | 860 m || 
|-id=483 bgcolor=#E9E9E9
| 397483 ||  || — || September 14, 2007 || Catalina || CSS || — || align=right | 1.4 km || 
|-id=484 bgcolor=#fefefe
| 397484 ||  || — || September 3, 2007 || Catalina || CSS || NYS || align=right data-sort-value="0.79" | 790 m || 
|-id=485 bgcolor=#fefefe
| 397485 ||  || — || September 5, 2007 || Mount Lemmon || Mount Lemmon Survey || — || align=right data-sort-value="0.89" | 890 m || 
|-id=486 bgcolor=#E9E9E9
| 397486 ||  || — || September 8, 2007 || Anderson Mesa || LONEOS || — || align=right | 2.7 km || 
|-id=487 bgcolor=#fefefe
| 397487 ||  || — || September 9, 2007 || Mount Lemmon || Mount Lemmon Survey || NYS || align=right data-sort-value="0.66" | 660 m || 
|-id=488 bgcolor=#E9E9E9
| 397488 ||  || — || September 10, 2007 || Mount Lemmon || Mount Lemmon Survey || HNS || align=right | 1.1 km || 
|-id=489 bgcolor=#d6d6d6
| 397489 ||  || — || August 10, 2007 || Kitt Peak || Spacewatch || — || align=right | 3.2 km || 
|-id=490 bgcolor=#fefefe
| 397490 ||  || — || September 11, 2007 || Kitt Peak || Spacewatch || — || align=right data-sort-value="0.91" | 910 m || 
|-id=491 bgcolor=#E9E9E9
| 397491 ||  || — || September 12, 2007 || Mount Lemmon || Mount Lemmon Survey || — || align=right | 1.2 km || 
|-id=492 bgcolor=#fefefe
| 397492 ||  || — || September 15, 2007 || Lulin Observatory || LUSS || NYS || align=right data-sort-value="0.69" | 690 m || 
|-id=493 bgcolor=#fefefe
| 397493 ||  || — || September 12, 2007 || Catalina || CSS || — || align=right | 1.2 km || 
|-id=494 bgcolor=#E9E9E9
| 397494 ||  || — || September 10, 2007 || Kitt Peak || Spacewatch || — || align=right | 1.3 km || 
|-id=495 bgcolor=#E9E9E9
| 397495 ||  || — || September 10, 2007 || Kitt Peak || Spacewatch || (5) || align=right data-sort-value="0.86" | 860 m || 
|-id=496 bgcolor=#d6d6d6
| 397496 ||  || — || September 15, 2007 || Mount Lemmon || Mount Lemmon Survey || KOR || align=right | 1.4 km || 
|-id=497 bgcolor=#fefefe
| 397497 ||  || — || September 12, 2007 || Catalina || CSS || H || align=right data-sort-value="0.73" | 730 m || 
|-id=498 bgcolor=#fefefe
| 397498 ||  || — || September 13, 2007 || Kitt Peak || Spacewatch || critical || align=right data-sort-value="0.47" | 470 m || 
|-id=499 bgcolor=#E9E9E9
| 397499 ||  || — || September 10, 2007 || Mount Lemmon || Mount Lemmon Survey || — || align=right | 2.0 km || 
|-id=500 bgcolor=#E9E9E9
| 397500 ||  || — || September 10, 2007 || Catalina || CSS || — || align=right | 1.1 km || 
|}

397501–397600 

|-bgcolor=#fefefe
| 397501 ||  || — || September 3, 2007 || Catalina || CSS || — || align=right | 1.1 km || 
|-id=502 bgcolor=#fefefe
| 397502 ||  || — || September 11, 2007 || Kitt Peak || Spacewatch || — || align=right data-sort-value="0.86" | 860 m || 
|-id=503 bgcolor=#fefefe
| 397503 ||  || — || September 9, 2007 || Mount Lemmon || Mount Lemmon Survey || MAS || align=right data-sort-value="0.81" | 810 m || 
|-id=504 bgcolor=#fefefe
| 397504 ||  || — || September 11, 2007 || Catalina || CSS || — || align=right data-sort-value="0.98" | 980 m || 
|-id=505 bgcolor=#fefefe
| 397505 ||  || — || September 3, 2007 || Catalina || CSS || — || align=right data-sort-value="0.91" | 910 m || 
|-id=506 bgcolor=#E9E9E9
| 397506 ||  || — || September 10, 2007 || Mount Lemmon || Mount Lemmon Survey || — || align=right | 1.2 km || 
|-id=507 bgcolor=#fefefe
| 397507 ||  || — || September 18, 2007 || Kitt Peak || Spacewatch || MAS || align=right data-sort-value="0.89" | 890 m || 
|-id=508 bgcolor=#fefefe
| 397508 ||  || — || September 18, 2007 || Kitt Peak || Spacewatch || — || align=right data-sort-value="0.83" | 830 m || 
|-id=509 bgcolor=#E9E9E9
| 397509 ||  || — || September 18, 2007 || Mount Lemmon || Mount Lemmon Survey || MAR || align=right | 1.1 km || 
|-id=510 bgcolor=#fefefe
| 397510 || 2007 TB || — || October 1, 2007 || Eskridge || G. Hug || — || align=right data-sort-value="0.78" | 780 m || 
|-id=511 bgcolor=#fefefe
| 397511 ||  || — || October 9, 2007 || Dauban || Chante-Perdrix Obs. || H || align=right data-sort-value="0.64" | 640 m || 
|-id=512 bgcolor=#E9E9E9
| 397512 ||  || — || March 8, 2005 || Mount Lemmon || Mount Lemmon Survey || — || align=right | 1.6 km || 
|-id=513 bgcolor=#E9E9E9
| 397513 ||  || — || September 10, 2007 || Mount Lemmon || Mount Lemmon Survey || — || align=right | 2.1 km || 
|-id=514 bgcolor=#FA8072
| 397514 ||  || — || October 7, 2007 || Catalina || CSS || H || align=right data-sort-value="0.79" | 790 m || 
|-id=515 bgcolor=#E9E9E9
| 397515 ||  || — || October 4, 2007 || Kitt Peak || Spacewatch || — || align=right data-sort-value="0.89" | 890 m || 
|-id=516 bgcolor=#E9E9E9
| 397516 ||  || — || October 4, 2007 || Kitt Peak || Spacewatch || MAR || align=right data-sort-value="0.88" | 880 m || 
|-id=517 bgcolor=#E9E9E9
| 397517 ||  || — || October 7, 2007 || Mount Lemmon || Mount Lemmon Survey || — || align=right | 1.1 km || 
|-id=518 bgcolor=#fefefe
| 397518 ||  || — || September 12, 2007 || Mount Lemmon || Mount Lemmon Survey || MAScritical || align=right data-sort-value="0.62" | 620 m || 
|-id=519 bgcolor=#fefefe
| 397519 ||  || — || October 8, 2007 || Mount Lemmon || Mount Lemmon Survey || — || align=right data-sort-value="0.78" | 780 m || 
|-id=520 bgcolor=#E9E9E9
| 397520 ||  || — || October 8, 2007 || Mount Lemmon || Mount Lemmon Survey || HNS || align=right | 1.3 km || 
|-id=521 bgcolor=#E9E9E9
| 397521 ||  || — || October 8, 2007 || Mount Lemmon || Mount Lemmon Survey || — || align=right data-sort-value="0.94" | 940 m || 
|-id=522 bgcolor=#fefefe
| 397522 ||  || — || October 9, 2007 || Anderson Mesa || LONEOS || — || align=right data-sort-value="0.93" | 930 m || 
|-id=523 bgcolor=#E9E9E9
| 397523 ||  || — || October 6, 2007 || Kitt Peak || Spacewatch || — || align=right | 1.8 km || 
|-id=524 bgcolor=#fefefe
| 397524 ||  || — || October 6, 2007 || Kitt Peak || Spacewatch || V || align=right data-sort-value="0.61" | 610 m || 
|-id=525 bgcolor=#fefefe
| 397525 ||  || — || October 4, 2007 || Catalina || CSS || — || align=right data-sort-value="0.85" | 850 m || 
|-id=526 bgcolor=#fefefe
| 397526 ||  || — || October 4, 2007 || Catalina || CSS || — || align=right data-sort-value="0.88" | 880 m || 
|-id=527 bgcolor=#fefefe
| 397527 ||  || — || October 4, 2007 || Kitt Peak || Spacewatch || — || align=right data-sort-value="0.87" | 870 m || 
|-id=528 bgcolor=#fefefe
| 397528 ||  || — || September 12, 2007 || Mount Lemmon || Mount Lemmon Survey || critical || align=right data-sort-value="0.78" | 780 m || 
|-id=529 bgcolor=#fefefe
| 397529 ||  || — || October 7, 2007 || Catalina || CSS || — || align=right data-sort-value="0.82" | 820 m || 
|-id=530 bgcolor=#fefefe
| 397530 ||  || — || August 10, 2007 || Kitt Peak || Spacewatch || MAS || align=right data-sort-value="0.65" | 650 m || 
|-id=531 bgcolor=#E9E9E9
| 397531 ||  || — || May 3, 2005 || Kitt Peak || Spacewatch || — || align=right | 2.4 km || 
|-id=532 bgcolor=#E9E9E9
| 397532 ||  || — || October 7, 2007 || Kitt Peak || Spacewatch || — || align=right | 2.5 km || 
|-id=533 bgcolor=#E9E9E9
| 397533 ||  || — || October 7, 2007 || Kitt Peak || Spacewatch || — || align=right | 1.0 km || 
|-id=534 bgcolor=#E9E9E9
| 397534 ||  || — || September 8, 2007 || Mount Lemmon || Mount Lemmon Survey || MAR || align=right | 1.1 km || 
|-id=535 bgcolor=#E9E9E9
| 397535 ||  || — || October 9, 2007 || Kitt Peak || Spacewatch || — || align=right | 1.2 km || 
|-id=536 bgcolor=#E9E9E9
| 397536 ||  || — || October 10, 2007 || Kitt Peak || Spacewatch || — || align=right | 2.5 km || 
|-id=537 bgcolor=#E9E9E9
| 397537 ||  || — || October 10, 2007 || Kitt Peak || Spacewatch || — || align=right | 1.9 km || 
|-id=538 bgcolor=#fefefe
| 397538 ||  || — || October 12, 2007 || Kitt Peak || Spacewatch || — || align=right data-sort-value="0.65" | 650 m || 
|-id=539 bgcolor=#E9E9E9
| 397539 ||  || — || September 26, 1995 || Kitt Peak || Spacewatch || — || align=right | 1.6 km || 
|-id=540 bgcolor=#fefefe
| 397540 ||  || — || October 11, 2007 || Catalina || CSS || — || align=right data-sort-value="0.91" | 910 m || 
|-id=541 bgcolor=#E9E9E9
| 397541 ||  || — || September 12, 2007 || Catalina || CSS || — || align=right | 1.8 km || 
|-id=542 bgcolor=#E9E9E9
| 397542 ||  || — || October 12, 2007 || Kitt Peak || Spacewatch || — || align=right | 2.5 km || 
|-id=543 bgcolor=#E9E9E9
| 397543 ||  || — || October 12, 2007 || Kitt Peak || Spacewatch || — || align=right data-sort-value="0.82" | 820 m || 
|-id=544 bgcolor=#fefefe
| 397544 ||  || — || October 11, 2007 || Mount Lemmon || Mount Lemmon Survey || NYScritical || align=right data-sort-value="0.55" | 550 m || 
|-id=545 bgcolor=#E9E9E9
| 397545 ||  || — || October 12, 2007 || Kitt Peak || Spacewatch || — || align=right | 2.4 km || 
|-id=546 bgcolor=#E9E9E9
| 397546 ||  || — || October 12, 2007 || Kitt Peak || Spacewatch || KON || align=right | 2.4 km || 
|-id=547 bgcolor=#E9E9E9
| 397547 ||  || — || October 11, 2007 || Kitt Peak || Spacewatch || — || align=right | 1.5 km || 
|-id=548 bgcolor=#E9E9E9
| 397548 ||  || — || October 11, 2007 || Kitt Peak || Spacewatch || — || align=right | 1.3 km || 
|-id=549 bgcolor=#E9E9E9
| 397549 ||  || — || October 11, 2007 || Kitt Peak || Spacewatch || — || align=right | 1.0 km || 
|-id=550 bgcolor=#E9E9E9
| 397550 ||  || — || October 11, 2007 || Kitt Peak || Spacewatch || (5) || align=right data-sort-value="0.85" | 850 m || 
|-id=551 bgcolor=#E9E9E9
| 397551 ||  || — || October 14, 2007 || Mount Lemmon || Mount Lemmon Survey || — || align=right | 1.2 km || 
|-id=552 bgcolor=#E9E9E9
| 397552 ||  || — || October 10, 2007 || Catalina || CSS || EUN || align=right | 1.5 km || 
|-id=553 bgcolor=#E9E9E9
| 397553 ||  || — || October 14, 2007 || Mount Lemmon || Mount Lemmon Survey || MAR || align=right | 1.4 km || 
|-id=554 bgcolor=#fefefe
| 397554 ||  || — || October 15, 2007 || Mount Lemmon || Mount Lemmon Survey || H || align=right data-sort-value="0.93" | 930 m || 
|-id=555 bgcolor=#E9E9E9
| 397555 ||  || — || October 14, 2007 || Kitt Peak || Spacewatch || — || align=right | 1.2 km || 
|-id=556 bgcolor=#E9E9E9
| 397556 ||  || — || October 15, 2007 || Catalina || CSS || — || align=right | 1.3 km || 
|-id=557 bgcolor=#E9E9E9
| 397557 ||  || — || September 12, 2007 || Mount Lemmon || Mount Lemmon Survey || — || align=right data-sort-value="0.90" | 900 m || 
|-id=558 bgcolor=#E9E9E9
| 397558 ||  || — || September 18, 2007 || Anderson Mesa || LONEOS || — || align=right | 3.0 km || 
|-id=559 bgcolor=#E9E9E9
| 397559 ||  || — || October 10, 2007 || Mount Lemmon || Mount Lemmon Survey || ADE || align=right | 2.5 km || 
|-id=560 bgcolor=#E9E9E9
| 397560 ||  || — || October 9, 2007 || Kitt Peak || Spacewatch || — || align=right | 2.7 km || 
|-id=561 bgcolor=#E9E9E9
| 397561 ||  || — || October 14, 2007 || Mount Lemmon || Mount Lemmon Survey || — || align=right data-sort-value="0.97" | 970 m || 
|-id=562 bgcolor=#E9E9E9
| 397562 ||  || — || October 10, 2007 || Mount Lemmon || Mount Lemmon Survey || — || align=right data-sort-value="0.88" | 880 m || 
|-id=563 bgcolor=#E9E9E9
| 397563 ||  || — || October 12, 2007 || Socorro || LINEAR || HNS || align=right | 1.2 km || 
|-id=564 bgcolor=#fefefe
| 397564 ||  || — || October 17, 2007 || Anderson Mesa || LONEOS || — || align=right | 1.0 km || 
|-id=565 bgcolor=#E9E9E9
| 397565 ||  || — || October 18, 2007 || Catalina || CSS || — || align=right | 1.1 km || 
|-id=566 bgcolor=#E9E9E9
| 397566 ||  || — || October 17, 2007 || Catalina || CSS || EUN || align=right | 1.4 km || 
|-id=567 bgcolor=#E9E9E9
| 397567 ||  || — || October 16, 2007 || Mount Lemmon || Mount Lemmon Survey || — || align=right data-sort-value="0.81" | 810 m || 
|-id=568 bgcolor=#fefefe
| 397568 ||  || — || October 19, 2007 || Catalina || CSS || H || align=right data-sort-value="0.73" | 730 m || 
|-id=569 bgcolor=#E9E9E9
| 397569 ||  || — || August 24, 2007 || Kitt Peak || Spacewatch || EUN || align=right | 1.7 km || 
|-id=570 bgcolor=#fefefe
| 397570 ||  || — || September 13, 2007 || Mount Lemmon || Mount Lemmon Survey || H || align=right data-sort-value="0.78" | 780 m || 
|-id=571 bgcolor=#fefefe
| 397571 ||  || — || October 30, 2007 || Kitt Peak || Spacewatch || — || align=right data-sort-value="0.90" | 900 m || 
|-id=572 bgcolor=#E9E9E9
| 397572 ||  || — || September 9, 2007 || Mount Lemmon || Mount Lemmon Survey || EUN || align=right | 1.5 km || 
|-id=573 bgcolor=#E9E9E9
| 397573 ||  || — || October 12, 2007 || Kitt Peak || Spacewatch || MAR || align=right data-sort-value="0.80" | 800 m || 
|-id=574 bgcolor=#fefefe
| 397574 ||  || — || October 30, 2007 || Mount Lemmon || Mount Lemmon Survey || — || align=right data-sort-value="0.71" | 710 m || 
|-id=575 bgcolor=#E9E9E9
| 397575 ||  || — || October 30, 2007 || Kitt Peak || Spacewatch || — || align=right | 2.0 km || 
|-id=576 bgcolor=#fefefe
| 397576 ||  || — || October 30, 2007 || Mount Lemmon || Mount Lemmon Survey || — || align=right data-sort-value="0.86" | 860 m || 
|-id=577 bgcolor=#E9E9E9
| 397577 ||  || — || October 30, 2007 || Mount Lemmon || Mount Lemmon Survey || EUN || align=right data-sort-value="0.92" | 920 m || 
|-id=578 bgcolor=#fefefe
| 397578 ||  || — || October 31, 2007 || Mount Lemmon || Mount Lemmon Survey || — || align=right data-sort-value="0.87" | 870 m || 
|-id=579 bgcolor=#E9E9E9
| 397579 ||  || — || October 17, 2007 || Mount Lemmon || Mount Lemmon Survey || — || align=right | 1.5 km || 
|-id=580 bgcolor=#E9E9E9
| 397580 ||  || — || October 30, 2007 || Kitt Peak || Spacewatch || — || align=right | 1.1 km || 
|-id=581 bgcolor=#fefefe
| 397581 ||  || — || October 19, 2007 || Kitt Peak || Spacewatch || — || align=right data-sort-value="0.73" | 730 m || 
|-id=582 bgcolor=#fefefe
| 397582 ||  || — || October 17, 2007 || Mount Lemmon || Mount Lemmon Survey || V || align=right data-sort-value="0.72" | 720 m || 
|-id=583 bgcolor=#E9E9E9
| 397583 ||  || — || October 19, 2007 || Catalina || CSS || — || align=right data-sort-value="0.94" | 940 m || 
|-id=584 bgcolor=#E9E9E9
| 397584 ||  || — || October 21, 2007 || Mount Lemmon || Mount Lemmon Survey || — || align=right | 1.2 km || 
|-id=585 bgcolor=#E9E9E9
| 397585 ||  || — || October 8, 2007 || Mount Lemmon || Mount Lemmon Survey || — || align=right | 1.4 km || 
|-id=586 bgcolor=#E9E9E9
| 397586 ||  || — || October 14, 2007 || Catalina || CSS || — || align=right | 2.6 km || 
|-id=587 bgcolor=#fefefe
| 397587 ||  || — || September 10, 2007 || Catalina || CSS || — || align=right data-sort-value="0.91" | 910 m || 
|-id=588 bgcolor=#fefefe
| 397588 ||  || — || November 2, 2007 || 7300 Observatory || W. K. Y. Yeung || — || align=right data-sort-value="0.91" | 910 m || 
|-id=589 bgcolor=#fefefe
| 397589 ||  || — || October 19, 2007 || Catalina || CSS || H || align=right data-sort-value="0.78" | 780 m || 
|-id=590 bgcolor=#E9E9E9
| 397590 ||  || — || November 1, 2007 || Kitt Peak || Spacewatch || — || align=right | 2.3 km || 
|-id=591 bgcolor=#E9E9E9
| 397591 ||  || — || October 9, 2007 || Kitt Peak || Spacewatch || — || align=right | 2.0 km || 
|-id=592 bgcolor=#E9E9E9
| 397592 ||  || — || November 1, 2007 || Kitt Peak || Spacewatch || — || align=right | 2.7 km || 
|-id=593 bgcolor=#E9E9E9
| 397593 ||  || — || November 1, 2007 || Kitt Peak || Spacewatch || (5) || align=right data-sort-value="0.97" | 970 m || 
|-id=594 bgcolor=#E9E9E9
| 397594 ||  || — || November 1, 2007 || Kitt Peak || Spacewatch || — || align=right | 2.1 km || 
|-id=595 bgcolor=#E9E9E9
| 397595 ||  || — || September 9, 2007 || Mount Lemmon || Mount Lemmon Survey || — || align=right | 1.8 km || 
|-id=596 bgcolor=#E9E9E9
| 397596 ||  || — || October 15, 2007 || Mount Lemmon || Mount Lemmon Survey || — || align=right | 1.0 km || 
|-id=597 bgcolor=#fefefe
| 397597 ||  || — || November 2, 2007 || Socorro || LINEAR || H || align=right data-sort-value="0.73" | 730 m || 
|-id=598 bgcolor=#fefefe
| 397598 ||  || — || November 5, 2007 || Socorro || LINEAR || H || align=right data-sort-value="0.85" | 850 m || 
|-id=599 bgcolor=#E9E9E9
| 397599 ||  || — || November 5, 2007 || La Sagra || OAM Obs. || (5) || align=right data-sort-value="0.87" | 870 m || 
|-id=600 bgcolor=#E9E9E9
| 397600 ||  || — || November 2, 2007 || Socorro || LINEAR || HNS || align=right | 1.4 km || 
|}

397601–397700 

|-bgcolor=#fefefe
| 397601 ||  || — || November 8, 2007 || Socorro || LINEAR || H || align=right data-sort-value="0.96" | 960 m || 
|-id=602 bgcolor=#E9E9E9
| 397602 ||  || — || November 7, 2007 || Bisei SG Center || BATTeRS || — || align=right data-sort-value="0.90" | 900 m || 
|-id=603 bgcolor=#E9E9E9
| 397603 ||  || — || October 21, 2007 || Catalina || CSS || — || align=right | 1.7 km || 
|-id=604 bgcolor=#E9E9E9
| 397604 ||  || — || October 20, 2007 || Kitt Peak || Spacewatch || — || align=right | 1.5 km || 
|-id=605 bgcolor=#E9E9E9
| 397605 ||  || — || November 5, 2007 || Kitt Peak || Spacewatch || NEM || align=right | 2.1 km || 
|-id=606 bgcolor=#E9E9E9
| 397606 ||  || — || October 20, 2007 || Mount Lemmon || Mount Lemmon Survey || — || align=right | 1.8 km || 
|-id=607 bgcolor=#E9E9E9
| 397607 ||  || — || November 5, 2007 || Kitt Peak || Spacewatch || — || align=right | 2.4 km || 
|-id=608 bgcolor=#E9E9E9
| 397608 ||  || — || November 5, 2007 || Kitt Peak || Spacewatch || — || align=right | 1.4 km || 
|-id=609 bgcolor=#E9E9E9
| 397609 ||  || — || November 5, 2007 || Kitt Peak || Spacewatch || — || align=right data-sort-value="0.89" | 890 m || 
|-id=610 bgcolor=#E9E9E9
| 397610 ||  || — || November 2, 2007 || Mount Lemmon || Mount Lemmon Survey || — || align=right | 1.1 km || 
|-id=611 bgcolor=#fefefe
| 397611 ||  || — || November 12, 2007 || Socorro || LINEAR || H || align=right data-sort-value="0.72" | 720 m || 
|-id=612 bgcolor=#E9E9E9
| 397612 ||  || — || November 5, 2007 || Kitt Peak || Spacewatch || — || align=right | 1.6 km || 
|-id=613 bgcolor=#E9E9E9
| 397613 ||  || — || October 30, 2007 || Kitt Peak || Spacewatch || (5) || align=right data-sort-value="0.78" | 780 m || 
|-id=614 bgcolor=#E9E9E9
| 397614 ||  || — || November 12, 2007 || Catalina || CSS || — || align=right | 1.9 km || 
|-id=615 bgcolor=#E9E9E9
| 397615 ||  || — || November 5, 2007 || Kitt Peak || Spacewatch || — || align=right data-sort-value="0.87" | 870 m || 
|-id=616 bgcolor=#E9E9E9
| 397616 ||  || — || December 28, 2003 || Kitt Peak || Spacewatch || — || align=right | 2.0 km || 
|-id=617 bgcolor=#E9E9E9
| 397617 ||  || — || November 13, 2007 || Kitt Peak || Spacewatch || — || align=right | 2.3 km || 
|-id=618 bgcolor=#E9E9E9
| 397618 ||  || — || October 10, 2007 || Mount Lemmon || Mount Lemmon Survey || — || align=right | 2.2 km || 
|-id=619 bgcolor=#E9E9E9
| 397619 ||  || — || November 2, 2007 || Kitt Peak || Spacewatch || — || align=right | 1.7 km || 
|-id=620 bgcolor=#E9E9E9
| 397620 ||  || — || November 9, 2007 || Kitt Peak || Spacewatch || — || align=right data-sort-value="0.90" | 900 m || 
|-id=621 bgcolor=#E9E9E9
| 397621 ||  || — || November 6, 2007 || Mount Lemmon || Mount Lemmon Survey || — || align=right | 2.2 km || 
|-id=622 bgcolor=#E9E9E9
| 397622 ||  || — || November 12, 2007 || Catalina || CSS || — || align=right | 2.4 km || 
|-id=623 bgcolor=#E9E9E9
| 397623 ||  || — || November 4, 2007 || Socorro || LINEAR || — || align=right | 2.3 km || 
|-id=624 bgcolor=#d6d6d6
| 397624 ||  || — || November 7, 2007 || Socorro || LINEAR || — || align=right | 3.1 km || 
|-id=625 bgcolor=#E9E9E9
| 397625 ||  || — || November 9, 2007 || Catalina || CSS || — || align=right | 1.2 km || 
|-id=626 bgcolor=#E9E9E9
| 397626 ||  || — || November 2, 2007 || Kitt Peak || Spacewatch || — || align=right data-sort-value="0.92" | 920 m || 
|-id=627 bgcolor=#E9E9E9
| 397627 ||  || — || November 8, 2007 || Kitt Peak || Spacewatch || KON || align=right | 3.2 km || 
|-id=628 bgcolor=#E9E9E9
| 397628 ||  || — || November 15, 2007 || Socorro || LINEAR || EUN || align=right | 1.9 km || 
|-id=629 bgcolor=#d6d6d6
| 397629 ||  || — || November 7, 2007 || Mount Lemmon || Mount Lemmon Survey || — || align=right | 3.3 km || 
|-id=630 bgcolor=#FA8072
| 397630 ||  || — || November 20, 2007 || Mount Lemmon || Mount Lemmon Survey || H || align=right data-sort-value="0.65" | 650 m || 
|-id=631 bgcolor=#E9E9E9
| 397631 ||  || — || October 18, 2007 || Kitt Peak || Spacewatch || KON || align=right | 2.7 km || 
|-id=632 bgcolor=#E9E9E9
| 397632 ||  || — || October 9, 2007 || Kitt Peak || Spacewatch || WIT || align=right | 1.1 km || 
|-id=633 bgcolor=#E9E9E9
| 397633 ||  || — || November 3, 2007 || Kitt Peak || Spacewatch || — || align=right | 1.9 km || 
|-id=634 bgcolor=#E9E9E9
| 397634 ||  || — || November 16, 2007 || Mount Lemmon || Mount Lemmon Survey || — || align=right | 2.1 km || 
|-id=635 bgcolor=#d6d6d6
| 397635 ||  || — || November 19, 2007 || Mount Lemmon || Mount Lemmon Survey || — || align=right | 3.4 km || 
|-id=636 bgcolor=#fefefe
| 397636 ||  || — || December 1, 2007 || Lulin || LUSS || H || align=right data-sort-value="0.89" | 890 m || 
|-id=637 bgcolor=#E9E9E9
| 397637 ||  || — || November 3, 2007 || Catalina || CSS || — || align=right | 1.2 km || 
|-id=638 bgcolor=#E9E9E9
| 397638 ||  || — || September 27, 2007 || Mount Lemmon || Mount Lemmon Survey || — || align=right | 2.3 km || 
|-id=639 bgcolor=#E9E9E9
| 397639 ||  || — || December 4, 2007 || Mount Lemmon || Mount Lemmon Survey || — || align=right | 1.9 km || 
|-id=640 bgcolor=#E9E9E9
| 397640 ||  || — || November 2, 2007 || Mount Lemmon || Mount Lemmon Survey || — || align=right | 2.1 km || 
|-id=641 bgcolor=#fefefe
| 397641 ||  || — || December 3, 2007 || Catalina || CSS || H || align=right data-sort-value="0.74" | 740 m || 
|-id=642 bgcolor=#E9E9E9
| 397642 ||  || — || December 4, 2007 || Socorro || LINEAR || AEO || align=right | 1.5 km || 
|-id=643 bgcolor=#E9E9E9
| 397643 ||  || — || December 13, 2007 || Socorro || LINEAR || ADE || align=right | 2.5 km || 
|-id=644 bgcolor=#E9E9E9
| 397644 ||  || — || November 3, 2007 || Kitt Peak || Spacewatch || — || align=right | 2.3 km || 
|-id=645 bgcolor=#E9E9E9
| 397645 ||  || — || November 13, 2007 || Kitt Peak || Spacewatch || — || align=right | 1.8 km || 
|-id=646 bgcolor=#E9E9E9
| 397646 ||  || — || December 15, 2007 || Kitt Peak || Spacewatch || MRX || align=right | 1.0 km || 
|-id=647 bgcolor=#E9E9E9
| 397647 ||  || — || December 3, 2007 || Kitt Peak || Spacewatch || AGN || align=right | 1.3 km || 
|-id=648 bgcolor=#E9E9E9
| 397648 ||  || — || December 5, 2007 || Kitt Peak || Spacewatch || — || align=right | 2.4 km || 
|-id=649 bgcolor=#E9E9E9
| 397649 ||  || — || December 4, 2007 || Kitt Peak || Spacewatch || MRX || align=right | 1.2 km || 
|-id=650 bgcolor=#E9E9E9
| 397650 ||  || — || November 1, 2007 || Kitt Peak || Spacewatch || — || align=right | 2.1 km || 
|-id=651 bgcolor=#d6d6d6
| 397651 ||  || — || December 16, 2007 || Mount Lemmon || Mount Lemmon Survey || — || align=right | 3.6 km || 
|-id=652 bgcolor=#d6d6d6
| 397652 ||  || — || December 16, 2007 || Mount Lemmon || Mount Lemmon Survey || — || align=right | 2.3 km || 
|-id=653 bgcolor=#E9E9E9
| 397653 ||  || — || November 7, 2007 || Mount Lemmon || Mount Lemmon Survey || — || align=right | 1.4 km || 
|-id=654 bgcolor=#E9E9E9
| 397654 ||  || — || December 30, 2007 || Mount Lemmon || Mount Lemmon Survey || — || align=right | 2.4 km || 
|-id=655 bgcolor=#E9E9E9
| 397655 ||  || — || December 30, 2007 || Kitt Peak || Spacewatch || — || align=right | 2.1 km || 
|-id=656 bgcolor=#d6d6d6
| 397656 ||  || — || December 30, 2007 || Mount Lemmon || Mount Lemmon Survey || — || align=right | 3.2 km || 
|-id=657 bgcolor=#d6d6d6
| 397657 ||  || — || December 31, 2007 || Kitt Peak || Spacewatch || — || align=right | 2.2 km || 
|-id=658 bgcolor=#E9E9E9
| 397658 ||  || — || December 16, 2007 || Socorro || LINEAR || — || align=right | 2.8 km || 
|-id=659 bgcolor=#E9E9E9
| 397659 ||  || — || December 19, 2007 || Mount Lemmon || Mount Lemmon Survey || — || align=right | 2.4 km || 
|-id=660 bgcolor=#E9E9E9
| 397660 ||  || — || January 1, 2008 || Kitt Peak || Spacewatch || — || align=right | 3.0 km || 
|-id=661 bgcolor=#d6d6d6
| 397661 ||  || — || January 10, 2008 || Mount Lemmon || Mount Lemmon Survey || — || align=right | 2.2 km || 
|-id=662 bgcolor=#E9E9E9
| 397662 ||  || — || December 31, 2007 || Kitt Peak || Spacewatch || — || align=right | 2.5 km || 
|-id=663 bgcolor=#E9E9E9
| 397663 ||  || — || January 10, 2008 || Kitt Peak || Spacewatch || — || align=right | 1.8 km || 
|-id=664 bgcolor=#E9E9E9
| 397664 ||  || — || January 11, 2008 || Kitt Peak || Spacewatch || — || align=right | 2.1 km || 
|-id=665 bgcolor=#fefefe
| 397665 ||  || — || January 12, 2008 || Catalina || CSS || H || align=right data-sort-value="0.97" | 970 m || 
|-id=666 bgcolor=#fefefe
| 397666 ||  || — || January 5, 2008 || XuYi || PMO NEO || H || align=right data-sort-value="0.69" | 690 m || 
|-id=667 bgcolor=#fefefe
| 397667 ||  || — || January 10, 2008 || Kitt Peak || Spacewatch || H || align=right data-sort-value="0.97" | 970 m || 
|-id=668 bgcolor=#d6d6d6
| 397668 ||  || — || December 31, 2007 || Kitt Peak || Spacewatch || EOS || align=right | 2.0 km || 
|-id=669 bgcolor=#d6d6d6
| 397669 ||  || — || January 11, 2008 || Kitt Peak || Spacewatch || — || align=right | 2.0 km || 
|-id=670 bgcolor=#d6d6d6
| 397670 ||  || — || December 30, 2007 || Kitt Peak || Spacewatch || — || align=right | 2.7 km || 
|-id=671 bgcolor=#d6d6d6
| 397671 ||  || — || December 30, 2007 || Kitt Peak || Spacewatch || — || align=right | 2.4 km || 
|-id=672 bgcolor=#E9E9E9
| 397672 ||  || — || January 14, 2008 || Kitt Peak || Spacewatch || — || align=right | 2.9 km || 
|-id=673 bgcolor=#E9E9E9
| 397673 ||  || — || January 11, 2008 || Kitt Peak || Spacewatch || — || align=right | 1.6 km || 
|-id=674 bgcolor=#d6d6d6
| 397674 ||  || — || January 14, 2008 || Kitt Peak || Spacewatch || — || align=right | 2.3 km || 
|-id=675 bgcolor=#d6d6d6
| 397675 ||  || — || January 14, 2008 || Kitt Peak || Spacewatch || — || align=right | 3.8 km || 
|-id=676 bgcolor=#d6d6d6
| 397676 ||  || — || January 14, 2008 || Kitt Peak || Spacewatch || — || align=right | 5.8 km || 
|-id=677 bgcolor=#d6d6d6
| 397677 ||  || — || October 19, 2007 || Mount Lemmon || Mount Lemmon Survey || — || align=right | 3.6 km || 
|-id=678 bgcolor=#d6d6d6
| 397678 ||  || — || January 15, 2008 || Kitt Peak || Spacewatch || — || align=right | 2.2 km || 
|-id=679 bgcolor=#d6d6d6
| 397679 ||  || — || January 10, 2008 || Kitt Peak || Spacewatch || — || align=right | 1.9 km || 
|-id=680 bgcolor=#d6d6d6
| 397680 ||  || — || November 7, 2007 || Mount Lemmon || Mount Lemmon Survey || — || align=right | 3.3 km || 
|-id=681 bgcolor=#d6d6d6
| 397681 ||  || — || January 19, 2008 || Kitt Peak || Spacewatch || — || align=right | 3.0 km || 
|-id=682 bgcolor=#E9E9E9
| 397682 ||  || — || December 30, 2007 || Mount Lemmon || Mount Lemmon Survey || — || align=right | 2.3 km || 
|-id=683 bgcolor=#d6d6d6
| 397683 ||  || — || January 31, 2008 || Catalina || CSS || — || align=right | 2.8 km || 
|-id=684 bgcolor=#d6d6d6
| 397684 ||  || — || January 30, 2008 || Mount Lemmon || Mount Lemmon Survey || — || align=right | 2.1 km || 
|-id=685 bgcolor=#d6d6d6
| 397685 ||  || — || January 31, 2008 || Mount Lemmon || Mount Lemmon Survey || EMA || align=right | 2.5 km || 
|-id=686 bgcolor=#FA8072
| 397686 || 2008 CT || — || February 2, 2008 || Winterthur || M. Griesser || H || align=right data-sort-value="0.81" | 810 m || 
|-id=687 bgcolor=#d6d6d6
| 397687 ||  || — || February 3, 2008 || Kitt Peak || Spacewatch || — || align=right | 3.1 km || 
|-id=688 bgcolor=#d6d6d6
| 397688 ||  || — || February 2, 2008 || Kitt Peak || Spacewatch || — || align=right | 2.4 km || 
|-id=689 bgcolor=#d6d6d6
| 397689 ||  || — || November 14, 2007 || Mount Lemmon || Mount Lemmon Survey || — || align=right | 2.6 km || 
|-id=690 bgcolor=#d6d6d6
| 397690 ||  || — || February 3, 2008 || Kitt Peak || Spacewatch || — || align=right | 2.4 km || 
|-id=691 bgcolor=#d6d6d6
| 397691 ||  || — || February 10, 2008 || Mount Lemmon || Mount Lemmon Survey || — || align=right | 2.5 km || 
|-id=692 bgcolor=#d6d6d6
| 397692 ||  || — || February 10, 2008 || Mount Lemmon || Mount Lemmon Survey || — || align=right | 2.7 km || 
|-id=693 bgcolor=#fefefe
| 397693 ||  || — || February 6, 2008 || Catalina || CSS || H || align=right data-sort-value="0.88" | 880 m || 
|-id=694 bgcolor=#d6d6d6
| 397694 ||  || — || February 8, 2008 || Kitt Peak || Spacewatch || — || align=right | 2.9 km || 
|-id=695 bgcolor=#d6d6d6
| 397695 ||  || — || February 8, 2008 || Kitt Peak || Spacewatch || — || align=right | 2.4 km || 
|-id=696 bgcolor=#d6d6d6
| 397696 ||  || — || January 10, 2008 || Kitt Peak || Spacewatch || — || align=right | 2.5 km || 
|-id=697 bgcolor=#d6d6d6
| 397697 ||  || — || February 9, 2008 || Kitt Peak || Spacewatch || — || align=right | 2.2 km || 
|-id=698 bgcolor=#E9E9E9
| 397698 ||  || — || February 9, 2008 || Kitt Peak || Spacewatch || — || align=right | 1.7 km || 
|-id=699 bgcolor=#d6d6d6
| 397699 ||  || — || February 9, 2008 || Kitt Peak || Spacewatch || — || align=right | 2.5 km || 
|-id=700 bgcolor=#d6d6d6
| 397700 ||  || — || February 3, 2008 || Catalina || CSS || LIX || align=right | 3.7 km || 
|}

397701–397800 

|-bgcolor=#fefefe
| 397701 ||  || — || January 12, 2008 || Catalina || CSS || H || align=right data-sort-value="0.68" | 680 m || 
|-id=702 bgcolor=#d6d6d6
| 397702 ||  || — || February 13, 2008 || Catalina || CSS || — || align=right | 3.5 km || 
|-id=703 bgcolor=#d6d6d6
| 397703 ||  || — || February 2, 2008 || Kitt Peak || Spacewatch || — || align=right | 2.1 km || 
|-id=704 bgcolor=#d6d6d6
| 397704 ||  || — || February 10, 2008 || Mount Lemmon || Mount Lemmon Survey || — || align=right | 2.2 km || 
|-id=705 bgcolor=#d6d6d6
| 397705 ||  || — || February 8, 2008 || Kitt Peak || Spacewatch || — || align=right | 2.2 km || 
|-id=706 bgcolor=#d6d6d6
| 397706 ||  || — || February 8, 2008 || Kitt Peak || Spacewatch || — || align=right | 3.0 km || 
|-id=707 bgcolor=#d6d6d6
| 397707 ||  || — || February 10, 2008 || Mount Lemmon || Mount Lemmon Survey || — || align=right | 2.7 km || 
|-id=708 bgcolor=#d6d6d6
| 397708 ||  || — || February 10, 2008 || Mount Lemmon || Mount Lemmon Survey || — || align=right | 2.6 km || 
|-id=709 bgcolor=#d6d6d6
| 397709 ||  || — || February 11, 2008 || Mount Lemmon || Mount Lemmon Survey || — || align=right | 2.2 km || 
|-id=710 bgcolor=#d6d6d6
| 397710 ||  || — || February 8, 2008 || Kitt Peak || Spacewatch || — || align=right | 2.1 km || 
|-id=711 bgcolor=#d6d6d6
| 397711 ||  || — || February 9, 2008 || Kitt Peak || Spacewatch || — || align=right | 2.9 km || 
|-id=712 bgcolor=#d6d6d6
| 397712 ||  || — || February 10, 2008 || Kitt Peak || Spacewatch || — || align=right | 3.1 km || 
|-id=713 bgcolor=#d6d6d6
| 397713 ||  || — || February 11, 2008 || Kitt Peak || Spacewatch || TEL || align=right | 1.2 km || 
|-id=714 bgcolor=#d6d6d6
| 397714 ||  || — || January 30, 2008 || Mount Lemmon || Mount Lemmon Survey || — || align=right | 2.2 km || 
|-id=715 bgcolor=#d6d6d6
| 397715 ||  || — || February 29, 2008 || Purple Mountain || PMO NEO || — || align=right | 2.3 km || 
|-id=716 bgcolor=#d6d6d6
| 397716 ||  || — || February 29, 2008 || Catalina || CSS || — || align=right | 2.9 km || 
|-id=717 bgcolor=#d6d6d6
| 397717 ||  || — || January 12, 2008 || Kitt Peak || Spacewatch || — || align=right | 2.3 km || 
|-id=718 bgcolor=#d6d6d6
| 397718 ||  || — || February 28, 2008 || Catalina || CSS || — || align=right | 4.9 km || 
|-id=719 bgcolor=#d6d6d6
| 397719 ||  || — || February 29, 2008 || Mount Lemmon || Mount Lemmon Survey || — || align=right | 2.8 km || 
|-id=720 bgcolor=#d6d6d6
| 397720 ||  || — || December 20, 2007 || Mount Lemmon || Mount Lemmon Survey || — || align=right | 2.4 km || 
|-id=721 bgcolor=#d6d6d6
| 397721 ||  || — || February 29, 2008 || Kitt Peak || Spacewatch || — || align=right | 3.2 km || 
|-id=722 bgcolor=#d6d6d6
| 397722 ||  || — || February 28, 2008 || Kitt Peak || Spacewatch || — || align=right | 3.6 km || 
|-id=723 bgcolor=#d6d6d6
| 397723 ||  || — || October 22, 2005 || Kitt Peak || Spacewatch || — || align=right | 2.7 km || 
|-id=724 bgcolor=#d6d6d6
| 397724 ||  || — || February 10, 2008 || Kitt Peak || Spacewatch || — || align=right | 2.6 km || 
|-id=725 bgcolor=#d6d6d6
| 397725 ||  || — || March 3, 2008 || Mount Lemmon || Mount Lemmon Survey || — || align=right | 3.1 km || 
|-id=726 bgcolor=#d6d6d6
| 397726 ||  || — || March 4, 2008 || Kitt Peak || Spacewatch || — || align=right | 2.4 km || 
|-id=727 bgcolor=#d6d6d6
| 397727 ||  || — || March 1, 2008 || Kitt Peak || Spacewatch || — || align=right | 2.2 km || 
|-id=728 bgcolor=#d6d6d6
| 397728 ||  || — || November 30, 2005 || Mount Lemmon || Mount Lemmon Survey || VER || align=right | 3.1 km || 
|-id=729 bgcolor=#d6d6d6
| 397729 ||  || — || January 20, 2008 || Mount Lemmon || Mount Lemmon Survey || — || align=right | 4.5 km || 
|-id=730 bgcolor=#d6d6d6
| 397730 ||  || — || March 7, 2008 || Kitt Peak || Spacewatch || THM || align=right | 2.1 km || 
|-id=731 bgcolor=#d6d6d6
| 397731 ||  || — || February 7, 2008 || Mount Lemmon || Mount Lemmon Survey || — || align=right | 3.1 km || 
|-id=732 bgcolor=#d6d6d6
| 397732 ||  || — || March 6, 2008 || Catalina || CSS || — || align=right | 3.3 km || 
|-id=733 bgcolor=#E9E9E9
| 397733 ||  || — || March 8, 2008 || Kitt Peak || Spacewatch || — || align=right | 3.3 km || 
|-id=734 bgcolor=#d6d6d6
| 397734 ||  || — || March 8, 2008 || Kitt Peak || Spacewatch || THM || align=right | 2.2 km || 
|-id=735 bgcolor=#d6d6d6
| 397735 ||  || — || March 9, 2008 || Kitt Peak || Spacewatch || — || align=right | 2.8 km || 
|-id=736 bgcolor=#d6d6d6
| 397736 ||  || — || March 11, 2008 || Kitt Peak || Spacewatch || — || align=right | 2.5 km || 
|-id=737 bgcolor=#d6d6d6
| 397737 ||  || — || March 11, 2008 || Kitt Peak || Spacewatch || THM || align=right | 2.3 km || 
|-id=738 bgcolor=#d6d6d6
| 397738 ||  || — || March 10, 2008 || Mount Lemmon || Mount Lemmon Survey || EUP || align=right | 4.0 km || 
|-id=739 bgcolor=#d6d6d6
| 397739 ||  || — || March 8, 2008 || Mount Lemmon || Mount Lemmon Survey || THM || align=right | 1.9 km || 
|-id=740 bgcolor=#d6d6d6
| 397740 ||  || — || March 5, 2008 || Mount Lemmon || Mount Lemmon Survey || — || align=right | 3.9 km || 
|-id=741 bgcolor=#d6d6d6
| 397741 ||  || — || March 28, 2008 || Altschwendt || W. Ries || Tj (2.89) || align=right | 3.7 km || 
|-id=742 bgcolor=#d6d6d6
| 397742 ||  || — || March 26, 2008 || Mount Lemmon || Mount Lemmon Survey || — || align=right | 4.1 km || 
|-id=743 bgcolor=#d6d6d6
| 397743 ||  || — || February 1, 2008 || Kitt Peak || Spacewatch || — || align=right | 2.8 km || 
|-id=744 bgcolor=#d6d6d6
| 397744 ||  || — || March 27, 2008 || Kitt Peak || Spacewatch || — || align=right | 2.9 km || 
|-id=745 bgcolor=#d6d6d6
| 397745 ||  || — || March 27, 2008 || Kitt Peak || Spacewatch || — || align=right | 2.5 km || 
|-id=746 bgcolor=#d6d6d6
| 397746 ||  || — || March 28, 2008 || Mount Lemmon || Mount Lemmon Survey || — || align=right | 2.8 km || 
|-id=747 bgcolor=#d6d6d6
| 397747 ||  || — || February 12, 2008 || Mount Lemmon || Mount Lemmon Survey || — || align=right | 2.7 km || 
|-id=748 bgcolor=#d6d6d6
| 397748 ||  || — || March 28, 2008 || Mount Lemmon || Mount Lemmon Survey || EOS || align=right | 3.4 km || 
|-id=749 bgcolor=#d6d6d6
| 397749 ||  || — || March 29, 2008 || Kitt Peak || Spacewatch || — || align=right | 3.0 km || 
|-id=750 bgcolor=#d6d6d6
| 397750 ||  || — || March 28, 2008 || Kitt Peak || Spacewatch || — || align=right | 3.3 km || 
|-id=751 bgcolor=#d6d6d6
| 397751 ||  || — || January 30, 2008 || Mount Lemmon || Mount Lemmon Survey || — || align=right | 2.7 km || 
|-id=752 bgcolor=#d6d6d6
| 397752 ||  || — || March 30, 2008 || Kitt Peak || Spacewatch || — || align=right | 2.9 km || 
|-id=753 bgcolor=#d6d6d6
| 397753 ||  || — || March 31, 2008 || Mount Lemmon || Mount Lemmon Survey || — || align=right | 2.8 km || 
|-id=754 bgcolor=#d6d6d6
| 397754 ||  || — || March 1, 2008 || Kitt Peak || Spacewatch || — || align=right | 2.5 km || 
|-id=755 bgcolor=#d6d6d6
| 397755 ||  || — || March 31, 2008 || Kitt Peak || Spacewatch || — || align=right | 3.2 km || 
|-id=756 bgcolor=#d6d6d6
| 397756 ||  || — || March 31, 2008 || Kitt Peak || Spacewatch || — || align=right | 2.5 km || 
|-id=757 bgcolor=#d6d6d6
| 397757 ||  || — || March 31, 2008 || Kitt Peak || Spacewatch || — || align=right | 4.0 km || 
|-id=758 bgcolor=#d6d6d6
| 397758 ||  || — || March 29, 2008 || Kitt Peak || Spacewatch || — || align=right | 3.2 km || 
|-id=759 bgcolor=#d6d6d6
| 397759 ||  || — || March 31, 2008 || Kitt Peak || Spacewatch || — || align=right | 2.6 km || 
|-id=760 bgcolor=#d6d6d6
| 397760 ||  || — || April 1, 2008 || Kitt Peak || Spacewatch || EOS || align=right | 2.0 km || 
|-id=761 bgcolor=#d6d6d6
| 397761 ||  || — || April 3, 2008 || Mount Lemmon || Mount Lemmon Survey || — || align=right | 3.4 km || 
|-id=762 bgcolor=#d6d6d6
| 397762 ||  || — || April 3, 2008 || Mount Lemmon || Mount Lemmon Survey || — || align=right | 3.2 km || 
|-id=763 bgcolor=#d6d6d6
| 397763 ||  || — || March 5, 2008 || Mount Lemmon || Mount Lemmon Survey || — || align=right | 2.7 km || 
|-id=764 bgcolor=#d6d6d6
| 397764 ||  || — || February 11, 2008 || Mount Lemmon || Mount Lemmon Survey || — || align=right | 2.5 km || 
|-id=765 bgcolor=#d6d6d6
| 397765 ||  || — || April 5, 2008 || Kitt Peak || Spacewatch || ARM || align=right | 4.5 km || 
|-id=766 bgcolor=#d6d6d6
| 397766 ||  || — || April 7, 2008 || Kitt Peak || Spacewatch || — || align=right | 3.3 km || 
|-id=767 bgcolor=#d6d6d6
| 397767 ||  || — || August 25, 1998 || Caussols || ODAS || — || align=right | 3.1 km || 
|-id=768 bgcolor=#d6d6d6
| 397768 ||  || — || February 27, 2008 || Kitt Peak || Spacewatch || EOS || align=right | 2.1 km || 
|-id=769 bgcolor=#d6d6d6
| 397769 ||  || — || April 6, 2008 || Mount Lemmon || Mount Lemmon Survey || THM || align=right | 2.1 km || 
|-id=770 bgcolor=#d6d6d6
| 397770 ||  || — || April 9, 2008 || Kitt Peak || Spacewatch || — || align=right | 3.3 km || 
|-id=771 bgcolor=#d6d6d6
| 397771 ||  || — || April 11, 2008 || Kitt Peak || Spacewatch || — || align=right | 3.0 km || 
|-id=772 bgcolor=#d6d6d6
| 397772 ||  || — || April 4, 2008 || Kitt Peak || Spacewatch || — || align=right | 3.4 km || 
|-id=773 bgcolor=#d6d6d6
| 397773 ||  || — || April 8, 2008 || Kitt Peak || Spacewatch || — || align=right | 3.5 km || 
|-id=774 bgcolor=#d6d6d6
| 397774 ||  || — || April 24, 2008 || Kitt Peak || Spacewatch || — || align=right | 2.9 km || 
|-id=775 bgcolor=#d6d6d6
| 397775 ||  || — || April 25, 2008 || Kitt Peak || Spacewatch || — || align=right | 3.5 km || 
|-id=776 bgcolor=#d6d6d6
| 397776 ||  || — || April 26, 2008 || Mount Lemmon || Mount Lemmon Survey || — || align=right | 3.1 km || 
|-id=777 bgcolor=#d6d6d6
| 397777 ||  || — || April 5, 2008 || Kitt Peak || Spacewatch || — || align=right | 4.2 km || 
|-id=778 bgcolor=#d6d6d6
| 397778 ||  || — || April 26, 2008 || Kitt Peak || Spacewatch || LUT || align=right | 4.0 km || 
|-id=779 bgcolor=#d6d6d6
| 397779 ||  || — || April 27, 2008 || Kitt Peak || Spacewatch || — || align=right | 5.7 km || 
|-id=780 bgcolor=#d6d6d6
| 397780 ||  || — || March 29, 2008 || Kitt Peak || Spacewatch || — || align=right | 3.4 km || 
|-id=781 bgcolor=#d6d6d6
| 397781 ||  || — || April 27, 2008 || Mount Lemmon || Mount Lemmon Survey || THM || align=right | 2.3 km || 
|-id=782 bgcolor=#d6d6d6
| 397782 ||  || — || April 15, 2008 || Mount Lemmon || Mount Lemmon Survey || EOS || align=right | 2.0 km || 
|-id=783 bgcolor=#d6d6d6
| 397783 ||  || — || October 28, 2005 || Kitt Peak || Spacewatch || — || align=right | 2.9 km || 
|-id=784 bgcolor=#d6d6d6
| 397784 ||  || — || April 26, 2008 || Mount Lemmon || Mount Lemmon Survey || — || align=right | 2.7 km || 
|-id=785 bgcolor=#d6d6d6
| 397785 ||  || — || March 28, 2008 || Mount Lemmon || Mount Lemmon Survey || — || align=right | 3.4 km || 
|-id=786 bgcolor=#d6d6d6
| 397786 ||  || — || April 14, 2002 || Socorro || LINEAR || Tj (2.99) || align=right | 3.1 km || 
|-id=787 bgcolor=#d6d6d6
| 397787 ||  || — || May 8, 2008 || Mount Lemmon || Mount Lemmon Survey || TIR || align=right | 3.2 km || 
|-id=788 bgcolor=#d6d6d6
| 397788 ||  || — || April 3, 2008 || Mount Lemmon || Mount Lemmon Survey || — || align=right | 2.9 km || 
|-id=789 bgcolor=#d6d6d6
| 397789 ||  || — || May 6, 2008 || Siding Spring || SSS || Tj (2.97) || align=right | 5.6 km || 
|-id=790 bgcolor=#C2FFFF
| 397790 ||  || — || April 15, 2008 || Kitt Peak || Spacewatch || L5 || align=right | 7.4 km || 
|-id=791 bgcolor=#d6d6d6
| 397791 ||  || — || May 13, 2008 || Mount Lemmon || Mount Lemmon Survey || — || align=right | 4.1 km || 
|-id=792 bgcolor=#d6d6d6
| 397792 ||  || — || November 27, 2006 || Mount Lemmon || Mount Lemmon Survey || — || align=right | 3.2 km || 
|-id=793 bgcolor=#d6d6d6
| 397793 ||  || — || May 27, 2008 || Kitt Peak || Spacewatch || — || align=right | 3.8 km || 
|-id=794 bgcolor=#d6d6d6
| 397794 ||  || — || May 30, 2008 || Kitt Peak || Spacewatch || — || align=right | 3.6 km || 
|-id=795 bgcolor=#d6d6d6
| 397795 ||  || — || April 6, 2008 || Mount Lemmon || Mount Lemmon Survey || — || align=right | 3.0 km || 
|-id=796 bgcolor=#d6d6d6
| 397796 ||  || — || May 15, 2008 || Mount Lemmon || Mount Lemmon Survey || — || align=right | 4.6 km || 
|-id=797 bgcolor=#d6d6d6
| 397797 ||  || — || June 30, 2008 || Kitt Peak || Spacewatch || — || align=right | 3.5 km || 
|-id=798 bgcolor=#FA8072
| 397798 || 2008 PD || — || August 1, 2008 || Hibiscus || S. F. Hönig, N. Teamo || — || align=right data-sort-value="0.60" | 600 m || 
|-id=799 bgcolor=#d6d6d6
| 397799 ||  || — || August 4, 2008 || La Sagra || OAM Obs. || THB || align=right | 3.7 km || 
|-id=800 bgcolor=#d6d6d6
| 397800 ||  || — || August 4, 2008 || La Sagra || OAM Obs. || — || align=right | 4.5 km || 
|}

397801–397900 

|-bgcolor=#fefefe
| 397801 ||  || — || August 29, 2008 || Dauban || F. Kugel || — || align=right data-sort-value="0.85" | 850 m || 
|-id=802 bgcolor=#fefefe
| 397802 ||  || — || August 26, 2008 || Socorro || LINEAR || — || align=right | 1.0 km || 
|-id=803 bgcolor=#fefefe
| 397803 ||  || — || August 24, 2008 || Kitt Peak || Spacewatch || — || align=right data-sort-value="0.86" | 860 m || 
|-id=804 bgcolor=#fefefe
| 397804 ||  || — || August 30, 2008 || Socorro || LINEAR || — || align=right data-sort-value="0.80" | 800 m || 
|-id=805 bgcolor=#fefefe
| 397805 ||  || — || September 4, 2008 || Goodricke-Pigott || R. A. Tucker || — || align=right | 1.1 km || 
|-id=806 bgcolor=#fefefe
| 397806 ||  || — || September 2, 2008 || Kitt Peak || Spacewatch || V || align=right data-sort-value="0.54" | 540 m || 
|-id=807 bgcolor=#fefefe
| 397807 ||  || — || August 23, 2008 || Kitt Peak || Spacewatch || — || align=right data-sort-value="0.95" | 950 m || 
|-id=808 bgcolor=#fefefe
| 397808 ||  || — || September 2, 2008 || Kitt Peak || Spacewatch || — || align=right data-sort-value="0.78" | 780 m || 
|-id=809 bgcolor=#fefefe
| 397809 ||  || — || September 4, 2008 || Kitt Peak || Spacewatch || — || align=right data-sort-value="0.72" | 720 m || 
|-id=810 bgcolor=#fefefe
| 397810 ||  || — || September 4, 2008 || Kitt Peak || Spacewatch || — || align=right data-sort-value="0.67" | 670 m || 
|-id=811 bgcolor=#fefefe
| 397811 ||  || — || September 5, 2008 || Kitt Peak || Spacewatch || V || align=right data-sort-value="0.62" | 620 m || 
|-id=812 bgcolor=#fefefe
| 397812 ||  || — || September 5, 2008 || Kitt Peak || Spacewatch || — || align=right data-sort-value="0.86" | 860 m || 
|-id=813 bgcolor=#fefefe
| 397813 ||  || — || September 7, 2008 || Catalina || CSS || — || align=right data-sort-value="0.70" | 700 m || 
|-id=814 bgcolor=#fefefe
| 397814 ||  || — || July 30, 2008 || Kitt Peak || Spacewatch || — || align=right data-sort-value="0.62" | 620 m || 
|-id=815 bgcolor=#fefefe
| 397815 ||  || — || September 7, 2008 || Mount Lemmon || Mount Lemmon Survey || — || align=right data-sort-value="0.76" | 760 m || 
|-id=816 bgcolor=#fefefe
| 397816 ||  || — || September 9, 2008 || Mount Lemmon || Mount Lemmon Survey || — || align=right data-sort-value="0.78" | 780 m || 
|-id=817 bgcolor=#fefefe
| 397817 ||  || — || September 6, 2008 || Catalina || CSS || — || align=right data-sort-value="0.68" | 680 m || 
|-id=818 bgcolor=#fefefe
| 397818 ||  || — || September 22, 2008 || Junk Bond || D. Healy || NYS || align=right data-sort-value="0.63" | 630 m || 
|-id=819 bgcolor=#fefefe
| 397819 ||  || — || September 22, 2008 || Socorro || LINEAR || — || align=right data-sort-value="0.90" | 900 m || 
|-id=820 bgcolor=#fefefe
| 397820 ||  || — || September 20, 2008 || Mount Lemmon || Mount Lemmon Survey || — || align=right data-sort-value="0.65" | 650 m || 
|-id=821 bgcolor=#fefefe
| 397821 ||  || — || September 22, 2008 || Kitt Peak || Spacewatch || — || align=right data-sort-value="0.68" | 680 m || 
|-id=822 bgcolor=#fefefe
| 397822 ||  || — || September 21, 2008 || Kitt Peak || Spacewatch || — || align=right data-sort-value="0.69" | 690 m || 
|-id=823 bgcolor=#fefefe
| 397823 ||  || — || September 22, 2008 || Mount Lemmon || Mount Lemmon Survey || — || align=right data-sort-value="0.73" | 730 m || 
|-id=824 bgcolor=#fefefe
| 397824 ||  || — || September 22, 2008 || Mount Lemmon || Mount Lemmon Survey || — || align=right data-sort-value="0.78" | 780 m || 
|-id=825 bgcolor=#fefefe
| 397825 ||  || — || September 22, 2008 || Kitt Peak || Spacewatch || — || align=right data-sort-value="0.81" | 810 m || 
|-id=826 bgcolor=#fefefe
| 397826 ||  || — || September 22, 2008 || Kitt Peak || Spacewatch || — || align=right data-sort-value="0.63" | 630 m || 
|-id=827 bgcolor=#FA8072
| 397827 ||  || — || September 29, 2008 || Mount Lemmon || Mount Lemmon Survey || — || align=right | 1.1 km || 
|-id=828 bgcolor=#fefefe
| 397828 ||  || — || September 6, 2008 || Mount Lemmon || Mount Lemmon Survey || — || align=right data-sort-value="0.70" | 700 m || 
|-id=829 bgcolor=#fefefe
| 397829 ||  || — || September 22, 2008 || Socorro || LINEAR || — || align=right data-sort-value="0.73" | 730 m || 
|-id=830 bgcolor=#fefefe
| 397830 ||  || — || September 24, 2008 || Socorro || LINEAR || — || align=right data-sort-value="0.64" | 640 m || 
|-id=831 bgcolor=#fefefe
| 397831 ||  || — || September 20, 2008 || Kitt Peak || Spacewatch || — || align=right data-sort-value="0.78" | 780 m || 
|-id=832 bgcolor=#fefefe
| 397832 ||  || — || September 21, 2008 || Mount Lemmon || Mount Lemmon Survey || — || align=right data-sort-value="0.62" | 620 m || 
|-id=833 bgcolor=#fefefe
| 397833 ||  || — || September 23, 2008 || Kitt Peak || Spacewatch || — || align=right data-sort-value="0.72" | 720 m || 
|-id=834 bgcolor=#fefefe
| 397834 ||  || — || September 24, 2008 || Kitt Peak || Spacewatch || — || align=right data-sort-value="0.78" | 780 m || 
|-id=835 bgcolor=#fefefe
| 397835 ||  || — || September 24, 2008 || Mount Lemmon || Mount Lemmon Survey || — || align=right data-sort-value="0.65" | 650 m || 
|-id=836 bgcolor=#fefefe
| 397836 ||  || — || September 25, 2008 || Mount Lemmon || Mount Lemmon Survey || — || align=right data-sort-value="0.78" | 780 m || 
|-id=837 bgcolor=#fefefe
| 397837 ||  || — || September 21, 2008 || Kitt Peak || Spacewatch || NYS || align=right data-sort-value="0.80" | 800 m || 
|-id=838 bgcolor=#fefefe
| 397838 ||  || — || September 29, 2008 || Catalina || CSS || — || align=right data-sort-value="0.78" | 780 m || 
|-id=839 bgcolor=#fefefe
| 397839 ||  || — || September 20, 2008 || Kitt Peak || Spacewatch || NYS || align=right data-sort-value="0.74" | 740 m || 
|-id=840 bgcolor=#E9E9E9
| 397840 ||  || — || September 22, 2008 || Mount Lemmon || Mount Lemmon Survey || — || align=right | 1.5 km || 
|-id=841 bgcolor=#fefefe
| 397841 ||  || — || September 28, 2008 || Mount Lemmon || Mount Lemmon Survey || — || align=right data-sort-value="0.62" | 620 m || 
|-id=842 bgcolor=#E9E9E9
| 397842 ||  || — || September 23, 2008 || Mount Lemmon || Mount Lemmon Survey || — || align=right | 1.2 km || 
|-id=843 bgcolor=#fefefe
| 397843 ||  || — || September 22, 2008 || Catalina || CSS || — || align=right data-sort-value="0.97" | 970 m || 
|-id=844 bgcolor=#fefefe
| 397844 ||  || — || September 23, 2008 || Kitt Peak || Spacewatch || — || align=right data-sort-value="0.73" | 730 m || 
|-id=845 bgcolor=#fefefe
| 397845 ||  || — || September 29, 2008 || Mount Lemmon || Mount Lemmon Survey || — || align=right data-sort-value="0.96" | 960 m || 
|-id=846 bgcolor=#fefefe
| 397846 ||  || — || October 1, 2008 || Hibiscus || S. F. Hönig, N. Teamo || — || align=right data-sort-value="0.71" | 710 m || 
|-id=847 bgcolor=#FFC2E0
| 397847 ||  || — || October 2, 2008 || Kitt Peak || Spacewatch || APO || align=right data-sort-value="0.62" | 620 m || 
|-id=848 bgcolor=#E9E9E9
| 397848 ||  || — || September 21, 2008 || Mount Lemmon || Mount Lemmon Survey || HNS || align=right | 1.0 km || 
|-id=849 bgcolor=#fefefe
| 397849 ||  || — || October 1, 2008 || Mount Lemmon || Mount Lemmon Survey || — || align=right data-sort-value="0.71" | 710 m || 
|-id=850 bgcolor=#fefefe
| 397850 ||  || — || October 1, 2008 || Mount Lemmon || Mount Lemmon Survey || NYS || align=right data-sort-value="0.57" | 570 m || 
|-id=851 bgcolor=#fefefe
| 397851 ||  || — || October 1, 2008 || Kitt Peak || Spacewatch || — || align=right | 1.0 km || 
|-id=852 bgcolor=#fefefe
| 397852 ||  || — || September 24, 2008 || Kitt Peak || Spacewatch || — || align=right data-sort-value="0.81" | 810 m || 
|-id=853 bgcolor=#fefefe
| 397853 ||  || — || September 7, 2008 || Mount Lemmon || Mount Lemmon Survey || — || align=right data-sort-value="0.64" | 640 m || 
|-id=854 bgcolor=#fefefe
| 397854 ||  || — || October 2, 2008 || Kitt Peak || Spacewatch || — || align=right data-sort-value="0.78" | 780 m || 
|-id=855 bgcolor=#fefefe
| 397855 ||  || — || October 3, 2008 || Mount Lemmon || Mount Lemmon Survey || V || align=right data-sort-value="0.64" | 640 m || 
|-id=856 bgcolor=#E9E9E9
| 397856 ||  || — || October 6, 2008 || Mount Lemmon || Mount Lemmon Survey || (5) || align=right | 1.1 km || 
|-id=857 bgcolor=#E9E9E9
| 397857 ||  || — || October 6, 2008 || Kitt Peak || Spacewatch || — || align=right | 1.3 km || 
|-id=858 bgcolor=#fefefe
| 397858 ||  || — || October 6, 2008 || Catalina || CSS || — || align=right data-sort-value="0.69" | 690 m || 
|-id=859 bgcolor=#fefefe
| 397859 ||  || — || September 23, 2008 || Kitt Peak || Spacewatch || — || align=right data-sort-value="0.57" | 570 m || 
|-id=860 bgcolor=#fefefe
| 397860 ||  || — || September 7, 2008 || Catalina || CSS || — || align=right data-sort-value="0.88" | 880 m || 
|-id=861 bgcolor=#fefefe
| 397861 ||  || — || October 16, 2001 || Kitt Peak || Spacewatch || — || align=right data-sort-value="0.77" | 770 m || 
|-id=862 bgcolor=#fefefe
| 397862 ||  || — || October 10, 2008 || Kitt Peak || Spacewatch || — || align=right data-sort-value="0.85" | 850 m || 
|-id=863 bgcolor=#fefefe
| 397863 ||  || — || October 7, 2008 || Kitt Peak || Spacewatch || MAS || align=right data-sort-value="0.75" | 750 m || 
|-id=864 bgcolor=#fefefe
| 397864 ||  || — || September 23, 2008 || Kitt Peak || Spacewatch || — || align=right data-sort-value="0.66" | 660 m || 
|-id=865 bgcolor=#fefefe
| 397865 ||  || — || September 24, 2008 || Mount Lemmon || Mount Lemmon Survey || — || align=right | 1.2 km || 
|-id=866 bgcolor=#fefefe
| 397866 ||  || — || October 20, 2008 || Kitt Peak || Spacewatch || — || align=right data-sort-value="0.80" | 800 m || 
|-id=867 bgcolor=#fefefe
| 397867 ||  || — || October 20, 2008 || Kitt Peak || Spacewatch || — || align=right data-sort-value="0.91" | 910 m || 
|-id=868 bgcolor=#fefefe
| 397868 ||  || — || October 20, 2008 || Kitt Peak || Spacewatch || NYS || align=right data-sort-value="0.73" | 730 m || 
|-id=869 bgcolor=#fefefe
| 397869 ||  || — || October 20, 2008 || Kitt Peak || Spacewatch || MAS || align=right data-sort-value="0.71" | 710 m || 
|-id=870 bgcolor=#fefefe
| 397870 ||  || — || October 20, 2008 || Kitt Peak || Spacewatch || — || align=right | 1.1 km || 
|-id=871 bgcolor=#fefefe
| 397871 ||  || — || October 3, 2008 || Mount Lemmon || Mount Lemmon Survey || — || align=right data-sort-value="0.98" | 980 m || 
|-id=872 bgcolor=#fefefe
| 397872 ||  || — || October 20, 2008 || Kitt Peak || Spacewatch || — || align=right data-sort-value="0.62" | 620 m || 
|-id=873 bgcolor=#fefefe
| 397873 ||  || — || October 8, 2008 || Mount Lemmon || Mount Lemmon Survey || — || align=right | 1.2 km || 
|-id=874 bgcolor=#E9E9E9
| 397874 ||  || — || October 21, 2008 || Kitt Peak || Spacewatch || (5) || align=right data-sort-value="0.93" | 930 m || 
|-id=875 bgcolor=#fefefe
| 397875 ||  || — || October 21, 2008 || Kitt Peak || Spacewatch || V || align=right data-sort-value="0.72" | 720 m || 
|-id=876 bgcolor=#fefefe
| 397876 ||  || — || April 25, 2007 || Kitt Peak || Spacewatch || — || align=right data-sort-value="0.87" | 870 m || 
|-id=877 bgcolor=#E9E9E9
| 397877 ||  || — || September 23, 2008 || Kitt Peak || Spacewatch || — || align=right data-sort-value="0.87" | 870 m || 
|-id=878 bgcolor=#fefefe
| 397878 ||  || — || October 24, 2008 || Socorro || LINEAR || V || align=right data-sort-value="0.76" | 760 m || 
|-id=879 bgcolor=#fefefe
| 397879 ||  || — || October 27, 2008 || Bisei SG Center || BATTeRS || — || align=right data-sort-value="0.62" | 620 m || 
|-id=880 bgcolor=#fefefe
| 397880 ||  || — || October 22, 2008 || Kitt Peak || Spacewatch || — || align=right | 1.0 km || 
|-id=881 bgcolor=#fefefe
| 397881 ||  || — || October 22, 2008 || Kitt Peak || Spacewatch || — || align=right | 1.3 km || 
|-id=882 bgcolor=#fefefe
| 397882 ||  || — || October 22, 2008 || Kitt Peak || Spacewatch || — || align=right data-sort-value="0.78" | 780 m || 
|-id=883 bgcolor=#fefefe
| 397883 ||  || — || October 23, 2008 || Kitt Peak || Spacewatch || — || align=right data-sort-value="0.72" | 720 m || 
|-id=884 bgcolor=#fefefe
| 397884 ||  || — || October 23, 2008 || Kitt Peak || Spacewatch || — || align=right data-sort-value="0.94" | 940 m || 
|-id=885 bgcolor=#fefefe
| 397885 ||  || — || October 23, 2008 || Kitt Peak || Spacewatch || — || align=right data-sort-value="0.82" | 820 m || 
|-id=886 bgcolor=#fefefe
| 397886 ||  || — || October 24, 2008 || Kitt Peak || Spacewatch || — || align=right data-sort-value="0.86" | 860 m || 
|-id=887 bgcolor=#fefefe
| 397887 ||  || — || October 24, 2008 || Catalina || CSS || — || align=right data-sort-value="0.94" | 940 m || 
|-id=888 bgcolor=#fefefe
| 397888 ||  || — || October 24, 2008 || Kitt Peak || Spacewatch || MAS || align=right data-sort-value="0.71" | 710 m || 
|-id=889 bgcolor=#fefefe
| 397889 ||  || — || October 24, 2008 || Kitt Peak || Spacewatch || — || align=right data-sort-value="0.70" | 700 m || 
|-id=890 bgcolor=#fefefe
| 397890 ||  || — || October 27, 2008 || Great Shefford || P. Birtwhistle || — || align=right data-sort-value="0.57" | 570 m || 
|-id=891 bgcolor=#fefefe
| 397891 ||  || — || October 28, 2008 || Socorro || LINEAR || (2076) || align=right data-sort-value="0.94" | 940 m || 
|-id=892 bgcolor=#fefefe
| 397892 ||  || — || October 25, 2008 || Mount Lemmon || Mount Lemmon Survey || V || align=right data-sort-value="0.64" | 640 m || 
|-id=893 bgcolor=#d6d6d6
| 397893 ||  || — || October 25, 2008 || Kitt Peak || Spacewatch || — || align=right | 3.8 km || 
|-id=894 bgcolor=#fefefe
| 397894 ||  || — || October 26, 2008 || Kitt Peak || Spacewatch || — || align=right data-sort-value="0.52" | 520 m || 
|-id=895 bgcolor=#fefefe
| 397895 ||  || — || October 27, 2008 || Kitt Peak || Spacewatch || NYS || align=right data-sort-value="0.66" | 660 m || 
|-id=896 bgcolor=#fefefe
| 397896 ||  || — || December 28, 2005 || Mount Lemmon || Mount Lemmon Survey || — || align=right data-sort-value="0.85" | 850 m || 
|-id=897 bgcolor=#fefefe
| 397897 ||  || — || October 27, 2008 || Kitt Peak || Spacewatch || — || align=right data-sort-value="0.91" | 910 m || 
|-id=898 bgcolor=#fefefe
| 397898 ||  || — || October 27, 2008 || Kitt Peak || Spacewatch || NYS || align=right data-sort-value="0.72" | 720 m || 
|-id=899 bgcolor=#fefefe
| 397899 ||  || — || September 28, 2008 || Mount Lemmon || Mount Lemmon Survey || — || align=right data-sort-value="0.82" | 820 m || 
|-id=900 bgcolor=#fefefe
| 397900 ||  || — || October 28, 2008 || Kitt Peak || Spacewatch || — || align=right data-sort-value="0.75" | 750 m || 
|}

397901–398000 

|-bgcolor=#fefefe
| 397901 ||  || — || October 28, 2008 || Mount Lemmon || Mount Lemmon Survey || — || align=right data-sort-value="0.82" | 820 m || 
|-id=902 bgcolor=#fefefe
| 397902 ||  || — || October 28, 2008 || Kitt Peak || Spacewatch || — || align=right data-sort-value="0.86" | 860 m || 
|-id=903 bgcolor=#fefefe
| 397903 ||  || — || September 23, 2008 || Kitt Peak || Spacewatch || — || align=right data-sort-value="0.90" | 900 m || 
|-id=904 bgcolor=#fefefe
| 397904 ||  || — || October 31, 2008 || Mount Lemmon || Mount Lemmon Survey || V || align=right data-sort-value="0.72" | 720 m || 
|-id=905 bgcolor=#fefefe
| 397905 ||  || — || October 31, 2008 || Kitt Peak || Spacewatch || NYS || align=right data-sort-value="0.60" | 600 m || 
|-id=906 bgcolor=#fefefe
| 397906 ||  || — || October 21, 2008 || Kitt Peak || Spacewatch || — || align=right | 1.3 km || 
|-id=907 bgcolor=#fefefe
| 397907 ||  || — || October 21, 2008 || Mount Lemmon || Mount Lemmon Survey || — || align=right | 1.2 km || 
|-id=908 bgcolor=#fefefe
| 397908 ||  || — || October 22, 2008 || Kitt Peak || Spacewatch || — || align=right | 1.3 km || 
|-id=909 bgcolor=#fefefe
| 397909 ||  || — || October 25, 2008 || Kitt Peak || Spacewatch || — || align=right data-sort-value="0.90" | 900 m || 
|-id=910 bgcolor=#E9E9E9
| 397910 ||  || — || October 22, 2008 || Kitt Peak || Spacewatch || — || align=right data-sort-value="0.97" | 970 m || 
|-id=911 bgcolor=#fefefe
| 397911 ||  || — || November 1, 2008 || Mount Lemmon || Mount Lemmon Survey || — || align=right | 1.0 km || 
|-id=912 bgcolor=#fefefe
| 397912 ||  || — || October 25, 2008 || Mount Lemmon || Mount Lemmon Survey || — || align=right | 1.1 km || 
|-id=913 bgcolor=#fefefe
| 397913 ||  || — || October 8, 2008 || Mount Lemmon || Mount Lemmon Survey || — || align=right data-sort-value="0.97" | 970 m || 
|-id=914 bgcolor=#fefefe
| 397914 ||  || — || November 2, 2008 || Mount Lemmon || Mount Lemmon Survey || V || align=right data-sort-value="0.56" | 560 m || 
|-id=915 bgcolor=#fefefe
| 397915 ||  || — || November 3, 2008 || Kitt Peak || Spacewatch || MAS || align=right data-sort-value="0.78" | 780 m || 
|-id=916 bgcolor=#fefefe
| 397916 ||  || — || November 6, 2008 || Kitt Peak || Spacewatch || — || align=right data-sort-value="0.90" | 900 m || 
|-id=917 bgcolor=#fefefe
| 397917 ||  || — || November 9, 2008 || Kitt Peak || Spacewatch || NYS || align=right data-sort-value="0.59" | 590 m || 
|-id=918 bgcolor=#fefefe
| 397918 ||  || — || November 8, 2008 || Mount Lemmon || Mount Lemmon Survey || MAS || align=right data-sort-value="0.86" | 860 m || 
|-id=919 bgcolor=#E9E9E9
| 397919 ||  || — || November 6, 2008 || Mount Lemmon || Mount Lemmon Survey || — || align=right | 1.0 km || 
|-id=920 bgcolor=#E9E9E9
| 397920 ||  || — || November 3, 2008 || Mount Lemmon || Mount Lemmon Survey || — || align=right | 1.1 km || 
|-id=921 bgcolor=#E9E9E9
| 397921 ||  || — || November 2, 2008 || Socorro || LINEAR || — || align=right | 2.0 km || 
|-id=922 bgcolor=#fefefe
| 397922 ||  || — || November 18, 2008 || La Sagra || OAM Obs. || — || align=right | 1.1 km || 
|-id=923 bgcolor=#fefefe
| 397923 ||  || — || September 22, 2008 || Kitt Peak || Spacewatch || — || align=right data-sort-value="0.56" | 560 m || 
|-id=924 bgcolor=#E9E9E9
| 397924 ||  || — || September 7, 2008 || Mount Lemmon || Mount Lemmon Survey || AGN || align=right | 1.2 km || 
|-id=925 bgcolor=#fefefe
| 397925 ||  || — || October 19, 2001 || Kitt Peak || Spacewatch || V || align=right data-sort-value="0.51" | 510 m || 
|-id=926 bgcolor=#E9E9E9
| 397926 ||  || — || November 19, 2008 || Mount Lemmon || Mount Lemmon Survey || — || align=right data-sort-value="0.91" | 910 m || 
|-id=927 bgcolor=#fefefe
| 397927 ||  || — || April 26, 2003 || Kitt Peak || Spacewatch || — || align=right data-sort-value="0.72" | 720 m || 
|-id=928 bgcolor=#fefefe
| 397928 ||  || — || November 17, 2008 || Kitt Peak || Spacewatch || — || align=right | 1.3 km || 
|-id=929 bgcolor=#E9E9E9
| 397929 ||  || — || November 18, 2008 || Socorro || LINEAR || — || align=right | 1.4 km || 
|-id=930 bgcolor=#fefefe
| 397930 ||  || — || October 22, 2008 || Kitt Peak || Spacewatch || V || align=right data-sort-value="0.85" | 850 m || 
|-id=931 bgcolor=#fefefe
| 397931 ||  || — || November 18, 2008 || Kitt Peak || Spacewatch || — || align=right data-sort-value="0.81" | 810 m || 
|-id=932 bgcolor=#fefefe
| 397932 ||  || — || November 19, 2008 || Mount Lemmon || Mount Lemmon Survey || — || align=right data-sort-value="0.96" | 960 m || 
|-id=933 bgcolor=#fefefe
| 397933 ||  || — || November 7, 2008 || Mount Lemmon || Mount Lemmon Survey || — || align=right | 1.8 km || 
|-id=934 bgcolor=#E9E9E9
| 397934 ||  || — || November 30, 2008 || Kitt Peak || Spacewatch || — || align=right | 1.1 km || 
|-id=935 bgcolor=#fefefe
| 397935 ||  || — || November 30, 2008 || Kitt Peak || Spacewatch || — || align=right data-sort-value="0.90" | 900 m || 
|-id=936 bgcolor=#E9E9E9
| 397936 ||  || — || December 7, 2008 || Marly || P. Kocher || — || align=right | 1.3 km || 
|-id=937 bgcolor=#fefefe
| 397937 ||  || — || December 2, 2008 || Kitt Peak || Spacewatch || — || align=right data-sort-value="0.79" | 790 m || 
|-id=938 bgcolor=#E9E9E9
| 397938 ||  || — || December 2, 2008 || Kitt Peak || Spacewatch || (5) || align=right data-sort-value="0.56" | 560 m || 
|-id=939 bgcolor=#fefefe
| 397939 ||  || — || December 2, 2008 || Kitt Peak || Spacewatch || V || align=right data-sort-value="0.78" | 780 m || 
|-id=940 bgcolor=#E9E9E9
| 397940 ||  || — || November 1, 2008 || Mount Lemmon || Mount Lemmon Survey || — || align=right | 1.8 km || 
|-id=941 bgcolor=#fefefe
| 397941 ||  || — || December 4, 2008 || Mount Lemmon || Mount Lemmon Survey || — || align=right data-sort-value="0.75" | 750 m || 
|-id=942 bgcolor=#E9E9E9
| 397942 ||  || — || December 3, 2008 || Socorro || LINEAR || — || align=right | 3.0 km || 
|-id=943 bgcolor=#fefefe
| 397943 ||  || — || December 1, 2008 || Kitt Peak || Spacewatch || — || align=right | 1.1 km || 
|-id=944 bgcolor=#E9E9E9
| 397944 ||  || — || December 4, 2008 || Catalina || CSS || — || align=right | 1.9 km || 
|-id=945 bgcolor=#E9E9E9
| 397945 ||  || — || December 7, 2008 || Mount Lemmon || Mount Lemmon Survey || — || align=right | 1.3 km || 
|-id=946 bgcolor=#fefefe
| 397946 ||  || — || December 21, 2008 || Mount Lemmon || Mount Lemmon Survey || — || align=right | 1.1 km || 
|-id=947 bgcolor=#E9E9E9
| 397947 ||  || — || December 21, 2008 || Mount Lemmon || Mount Lemmon Survey || — || align=right | 1.5 km || 
|-id=948 bgcolor=#E9E9E9
| 397948 ||  || — || December 21, 2008 || Mount Lemmon || Mount Lemmon Survey || — || align=right | 1.9 km || 
|-id=949 bgcolor=#fefefe
| 397949 ||  || — || December 18, 2004 || Mount Lemmon || Mount Lemmon Survey || — || align=right | 2.4 km || 
|-id=950 bgcolor=#fefefe
| 397950 ||  || — || December 30, 2008 || Mount Lemmon || Mount Lemmon Survey || — || align=right data-sort-value="0.82" | 820 m || 
|-id=951 bgcolor=#E9E9E9
| 397951 ||  || — || December 30, 2008 || Mount Lemmon || Mount Lemmon Survey || — || align=right | 1.8 km || 
|-id=952 bgcolor=#fefefe
| 397952 ||  || — || September 29, 2008 || Socorro || LINEAR || — || align=right data-sort-value="0.98" | 980 m || 
|-id=953 bgcolor=#fefefe
| 397953 ||  || — || December 30, 2008 || Kitt Peak || Spacewatch || — || align=right data-sort-value="0.73" | 730 m || 
|-id=954 bgcolor=#E9E9E9
| 397954 ||  || — || December 30, 2008 || Mount Lemmon || Mount Lemmon Survey || — || align=right | 1.8 km || 
|-id=955 bgcolor=#E9E9E9
| 397955 ||  || — || December 21, 2008 || Kitt Peak || Spacewatch || — || align=right | 1.2 km || 
|-id=956 bgcolor=#E9E9E9
| 397956 ||  || — || December 29, 2008 || Kitt Peak || Spacewatch || MAR || align=right data-sort-value="0.91" | 910 m || 
|-id=957 bgcolor=#E9E9E9
| 397957 ||  || — || December 29, 2008 || Kitt Peak || Spacewatch || — || align=right | 1.3 km || 
|-id=958 bgcolor=#E9E9E9
| 397958 ||  || — || December 21, 2008 || Kitt Peak || Spacewatch || — || align=right | 1.3 km || 
|-id=959 bgcolor=#fefefe
| 397959 ||  || — || October 31, 2008 || Mount Lemmon || Mount Lemmon Survey || — || align=right data-sort-value="0.86" | 860 m || 
|-id=960 bgcolor=#fefefe
| 397960 ||  || — || December 29, 2008 || Kitt Peak || Spacewatch || NYS || align=right data-sort-value="0.64" | 640 m || 
|-id=961 bgcolor=#E9E9E9
| 397961 ||  || — || December 13, 2004 || Campo Imperatore || CINEOS || — || align=right | 1.0 km || 
|-id=962 bgcolor=#fefefe
| 397962 ||  || — || December 4, 2008 || Mount Lemmon || Mount Lemmon Survey || — || align=right data-sort-value="0.83" | 830 m || 
|-id=963 bgcolor=#fefefe
| 397963 ||  || — || December 29, 2008 || Mount Lemmon || Mount Lemmon Survey || MAS || align=right data-sort-value="0.90" | 900 m || 
|-id=964 bgcolor=#E9E9E9
| 397964 ||  || — || December 29, 2008 || Kitt Peak || Spacewatch || — || align=right | 2.0 km || 
|-id=965 bgcolor=#fefefe
| 397965 ||  || — || December 30, 2008 || Kitt Peak || Spacewatch || — || align=right data-sort-value="0.97" | 970 m || 
|-id=966 bgcolor=#fefefe
| 397966 ||  || — || December 30, 2008 || Kitt Peak || Spacewatch || CLA || align=right | 1.8 km || 
|-id=967 bgcolor=#fefefe
| 397967 ||  || — || December 22, 2008 || Kitt Peak || Spacewatch || — || align=right data-sort-value="0.86" | 860 m || 
|-id=968 bgcolor=#E9E9E9
| 397968 ||  || — || December 1, 2008 || Kitt Peak || Spacewatch || — || align=right data-sort-value="0.85" | 850 m || 
|-id=969 bgcolor=#E9E9E9
| 397969 ||  || — || December 31, 2008 || Kitt Peak || Spacewatch || — || align=right | 2.8 km || 
|-id=970 bgcolor=#E9E9E9
| 397970 ||  || — || January 2, 2009 || Mount Lemmon || Mount Lemmon Survey || — || align=right | 1.9 km || 
|-id=971 bgcolor=#E9E9E9
| 397971 ||  || — || January 2, 2009 || Kitt Peak || Spacewatch || — || align=right | 1.2 km || 
|-id=972 bgcolor=#fefefe
| 397972 ||  || — || January 15, 2009 || Kitt Peak || Spacewatch || NYS || align=right data-sort-value="0.66" | 660 m || 
|-id=973 bgcolor=#E9E9E9
| 397973 ||  || — || January 1, 2009 || Kitt Peak || Spacewatch || — || align=right data-sort-value="0.94" | 940 m || 
|-id=974 bgcolor=#E9E9E9
| 397974 ||  || — || January 8, 2009 || Kitt Peak || Spacewatch || — || align=right | 1.5 km || 
|-id=975 bgcolor=#fefefe
| 397975 ||  || — || January 15, 2009 || Kitt Peak || Spacewatch || — || align=right data-sort-value="0.75" | 750 m || 
|-id=976 bgcolor=#fefefe
| 397976 ||  || — || January 2, 2009 || Mount Lemmon || Mount Lemmon Survey || — || align=right | 1.1 km || 
|-id=977 bgcolor=#E9E9E9
| 397977 ||  || — || January 15, 2009 || Socorro || LINEAR || — || align=right | 2.1 km || 
|-id=978 bgcolor=#E9E9E9
| 397978 ||  || — || January 7, 2009 || Kitt Peak || Spacewatch || — || align=right | 1.5 km || 
|-id=979 bgcolor=#E9E9E9
| 397979 ||  || — || January 16, 2009 || Kitt Peak || Spacewatch || — || align=right | 1.6 km || 
|-id=980 bgcolor=#E9E9E9
| 397980 ||  || — || November 23, 2008 || Mount Lemmon || Mount Lemmon Survey || (5) || align=right data-sort-value="0.78" | 780 m || 
|-id=981 bgcolor=#E9E9E9
| 397981 ||  || — || October 7, 2007 || Mount Lemmon || Mount Lemmon Survey || — || align=right | 1.2 km || 
|-id=982 bgcolor=#E9E9E9
| 397982 ||  || — || January 28, 2009 || Catalina || CSS || (5) || align=right | 1.00 km || 
|-id=983 bgcolor=#E9E9E9
| 397983 ||  || — || December 21, 2008 || Kitt Peak || Spacewatch || — || align=right | 1.5 km || 
|-id=984 bgcolor=#E9E9E9
| 397984 ||  || — || January 15, 2009 || Kitt Peak || Spacewatch || — || align=right data-sort-value="0.94" | 940 m || 
|-id=985 bgcolor=#E9E9E9
| 397985 ||  || — || December 30, 2008 || Mount Lemmon || Mount Lemmon Survey || — || align=right | 1.4 km || 
|-id=986 bgcolor=#E9E9E9
| 397986 ||  || — || November 8, 2008 || Mount Lemmon || Mount Lemmon Survey || (5) || align=right data-sort-value="0.86" | 860 m || 
|-id=987 bgcolor=#E9E9E9
| 397987 ||  || — || January 25, 2009 || Kitt Peak || Spacewatch || — || align=right | 1.4 km || 
|-id=988 bgcolor=#E9E9E9
| 397988 ||  || — || October 30, 2008 || Mount Lemmon || Mount Lemmon Survey || — || align=right | 1.7 km || 
|-id=989 bgcolor=#E9E9E9
| 397989 ||  || — || January 20, 2009 || Catalina || CSS || — || align=right | 1.2 km || 
|-id=990 bgcolor=#E9E9E9
| 397990 ||  || — || October 2, 2008 || Mount Lemmon || Mount Lemmon Survey || — || align=right | 1.8 km || 
|-id=991 bgcolor=#d6d6d6
| 397991 ||  || — || January 31, 2009 || Mount Lemmon || Mount Lemmon Survey || — || align=right | 3.3 km || 
|-id=992 bgcolor=#E9E9E9
| 397992 ||  || — || January 26, 2009 || Kitt Peak || Spacewatch || — || align=right | 1.4 km || 
|-id=993 bgcolor=#E9E9E9
| 397993 ||  || — || December 22, 2008 || Mount Lemmon || Mount Lemmon Survey || — || align=right | 2.7 km || 
|-id=994 bgcolor=#E9E9E9
| 397994 ||  || — || January 29, 2009 || Kitt Peak || Spacewatch || — || align=right data-sort-value="0.90" | 900 m || 
|-id=995 bgcolor=#E9E9E9
| 397995 ||  || — || November 24, 2008 || Mount Lemmon || Mount Lemmon Survey || — || align=right | 1.5 km || 
|-id=996 bgcolor=#E9E9E9
| 397996 ||  || — || January 30, 2009 || Mount Lemmon || Mount Lemmon Survey || EUN || align=right | 1.1 km || 
|-id=997 bgcolor=#d6d6d6
| 397997 ||  || — || January 31, 2009 || Mount Lemmon || Mount Lemmon Survey || — || align=right | 3.0 km || 
|-id=998 bgcolor=#E9E9E9
| 397998 ||  || — || January 16, 2009 || Kitt Peak || Spacewatch || — || align=right | 1.1 km || 
|-id=999 bgcolor=#d6d6d6
| 397999 ||  || — || June 3, 2005 || Kitt Peak || Spacewatch || — || align=right | 2.7 km || 
|-id=000 bgcolor=#d6d6d6
| 398000 ||  || — || January 31, 2009 || Kitt Peak || Spacewatch || — || align=right | 3.3 km || 
|}

References

External links 
 Discovery Circumstances: Numbered Minor Planets (395001)–(400000) (IAU Minor Planet Center)

0397